= Iran at the 2014 Asian Beach Games =

- IOC code: IRI
- NOC: National Olympic Committee of the Islamic Republic of Iran

in Phuket
- Competitors: 86 in 16 sports
- Flag bearer: Mohammad Ali Mokhtari
- Medals Ranked 4th: Gold 9 Silver 14 Bronze 8 Total 31

Asian Beach Games appearances
- 2008; 2010; 2012; 2014; 2016; 2026

Iran participated in the 2014 Asian Beach Games in Phuket, Thailand from 14 November to 23 November 2014.

== Competitors ==
Sport	Men	Women	Total
Aggressive inline skating	1		1
Beach athletics	6		6
Beach kabaddi	6		6
Beach kurash	5		5
Beach sambo	3		3
Beach sepak takraw	12		12
Beach soccer	10		10
Beach volleyball	4		4
Beach water polo	7		7
Beach wrestling	3		3
Bodybuilding	2		2
Duathlon	2		2
Footvolley	2		2
Ju-jitsu	9		9
Muaythai	6		6
Skateboarding	1		1
Sport climbing	3		3
Squash	2		2
Triathlon	2		2
Total	86	0	86

== Medal summary ==
=== Medals by sport ===
Sport	Gold	Silver	Bronze	Total
Beach athletics	1	2		3
Beach kabaddi	1			1
Beach kurash	1	2	2	5
Beach sambo		1	1	2
Beach sepak takraw			2	2
Beach soccer	1			1
Beach volleyball		1		1
Beach water polo		1		1
Beach wrestling	3			3
Bodybuilding	1	1		2
Footvolley		1		1
Ju-jitsu		3	2	5
Muaythai	1	2	1	4
Total	9	14	8	31

=== Medalists ===
Medal	Name	Sport	Event
Gold	Sobhan Taherkhani	Beach athletics	Men's long jump
Gold	Abouzar Mohajer; Mohsen Maghsoudloo; Mohammad Taghi Paeinmahalli; Meraj Sheikh; Hadi Oshtorak; Amir Hossein Mohammadmaleki	Beach kabaddi	Men
Gold	Ghanbar Ali Ghanbari	Beach kurash	Men's 66 kg
Gold	Peyman Hosseini; Amir Hossein Akbari; Hassan Abdollahi; Mehdi Hassani; Ali Naderi; Shahriar Mojdeh; Farid Boloukbashi; Mohammad Ali Mokhtari; Mohammad Ahmadzadeh; Hamid Behzadpour	Beach soccer	Men
Gold	Mohammad Naderi	Beach wrestling	Men's 70 kg
Gold	Kamran Hosseinijam	Beach wrestling	Men's 80 kg
Gold	Jaber Sadeghzadeh	Beach wrestling	Men's +80 kg
Gold	Javad Soltani	Bodybuilding	Men's 172 cm
Gold	Kaveh Soleimani	Muaythai	Men's 67 kg
Silver	Reza Ghasemi	Beach athletics	Men's 60 m
Silver	Mohammad Reza Aboutorabi; Mohammad Jafar Moradi; Mohammad Javad Sayyadi	Beach athletics	Men's cross-country team
Silver	Hadi Ghadimi	Beach kurash	Men's 73 kg
Silver	Ali Dehghanifard	Beach kurash	Men's 90 kg
Silver	Ehsan Karimian	Beach sambo	Men's 100 kg
Silver	Saber Houshmand; Bahman Salemi	Beach volleyball	Men
Silver	Sajjad Abdi; Hamed Malek-Khanbanan; Mohsen Jalili; Ataollah Barkhordi; Nima Khoshbakht; Ali Pirouzkhah; Amir Hossein Khani	Beach water polo	Men
Silver	Rouhollah Mirnourollahi	Bodybuilding	Men's 168 cm
Silver	Hamed Shadan; Majid Salmani	Footvolley	Men
Silver	Ahmad Reza Eidi	Ju-jitsu	Men's ne-waza 60 kg
Silver	Amir Hossein Khademian	Ju-jitsu	Men's ne-waza 70 kg
Silver	Mohammad Mansouri Davar	Ju-jitsu	Men's ne-waza 80 kg
Silver	Hossein Karami	Muaythai	Men's 75 kg
Silver	Mahmoud Sattari	Muaythai	Men's 81 kg
Bronze	Elias Aliakbari	Beach kurash	Men's 81 kg
Bronze	Hamid Gholi	Beach kurash	Men's +90 kg
Bronze	Yousef Karimian	Beach sambo	Men's 82 kg
Bronze	Hassan Alizadeh; Amir Khani; Vahid Ebrahimi; Mohammad Safaei Majd; Vahid Maleki; Abdolnaser Pangh	Beach sepak takraw	Men's regu
Bronze	Hassan Alizadeh; Amir Khani; Vahid Ebrahimi; Saman Jahantigh; Mohammad Safaei Majd; Vahid Maleki; Ali Azizabadi; Saeid Asiaban; Mehrdad Jafari; Pedram Khodadadeh; Abdolnaser Pangh; Omid Hassani	Beach sepak takraw	Men's team regu
Bronze	Ali Asghar Dokouhaki	Ju-jitsu	Men's ne-waza +90 kg
Bronze	Iraj Amirkhani	Ju-jitsu	Men's ne-waza openweight
Bronze	Yasin Ahmadi	Muaythai	Men's 57 kg

== Results by event ==
=== Aquatics ===
==== Beach water polo ====
Team	Event	Round robin					Rank
Team	Event	Round 1	Round 2	Round 3	Round 4	Round 5	Rank
Iran	Men	Hong Kong; W 19–6	Indonesia; W 16–10	Kuwait; L 15–16	Kazakhstan; W 11–9	Thailand; W 18–7	2nd place, silver medalist(s)
Roster: Sajjad Abdi; Hamed Malek-Khanbanan; Mohsen Jalili; Ataollah Barkhordi; Nima Khoshbakht; Ali Pirouzkhah; Amir Hossein Khani; Coach: Reza Jafari

=== Beach athletics ===
Athlete	Event	Time / Result	Rank
Reza Ghasemi	Men's 60 m	7.17	2nd place, silver medalist(s)
Mohammad Reza Aboutorabi; Mohammad Jafar Moradi; Sobhan Taherkhani; Reza Ghasemi	Men's 4 × 60 m relay	30.68	4
Mohammad Reza Aboutorabi	Men's cross-country	30:13	7
Mohammad Jafar Moradi	Men's cross-country	29:54	5
Mohammad Javad Sayyadi	Men's cross-country	30:45	8
Mohammad Reza Aboutorabi; Mohammad Jafar Moradi; Mohammad Javad Sayyadi	Men's cross-country team	20 pts	2nd place, silver medalist(s)
Mohammad Reza Vazifehdoust	Men's high jump	1.90 m	4
Sobhan Taherkhani	Men's long jump	7.28 m	1st place, gold medalist(s)

=== Beach kabaddi ===
Team	Event	Preliminary round				Semifinal	Final	Rank
Team	Event	Round 1	Round 2	Round 3	Rank	Semifinal	Final	Rank
Iran	Men	Bangladesh; W 45–32	India; W 40–31	Thailand; W 47–28	1 Q	Sri Lanka; W 45–34	Pakistan; W 40–27	1st place, gold medalist(s)
Roster: Abouzar Mohajer; Mohsen Maghsoudloo; Mohammad Taghi Paeinmahalli; Meraj Sheikh; Hadi Oshtorak; Amir Hossein Mohammadmaleki; Coach: Mohammad Shabani

=== Beach kurash ===
Athlete	Event	Round of 16	Quarterfinal	Semifinal	Final	Rank
Ghanbar Ali Ghanbari	Men's 66 kg	Balhara (IND); W 1–0	Khalimov (TJK); W 4–2	Artykow (TKM); W 2–1	Chan (TPE); W 4–1	1st place, gold medalist(s)
Hadi Ghadimi	Men's 73 kg	Bye	Trần (VIE); W 3–1	Nobeashi (JPN); W 1–0	Abraev (UZB); L 0–1	2nd place, silver medalist(s)
Elias Aliakbari	Men's 81 kg	Bye	Aminyar (AFG); W 1–0	Tukhtashov (UZB); L 2–3	Did not advance	3rd place, bronze medalist(s)
Ali Dehghanifard	Men's 90 kg	—N/a	Bye	Abdulghafoor (AFG); W 3–1	Elias (LIB); L 2–4	2nd place, silver medalist(s)
Hamid Gholi	Men's +90 kg	—N/a	Bye	Ahmadi (AFG); L RET	Did not advance	3rd place, bronze medalist(s)

=== Beach sambo ===
Athlete	Event	Round of 16	Quarterfinal	Semifinal	Final	Rank
Vahid Hassanzadeh	Men's 68 kg	Te (KGZ); L Throw	Did not advance			9
Yousef Karimian	Men's 82 kg	Asylbek Uulu (KGZ); W Throw	Jumaev (UZB); W Throw	Kabdelov (KAZ); L Throw	Did not advance	3rd place, bronze medalist(s)
Ehsan Karimian	Men's 100 kg	Ýalkapow (TKM); W Throw	Ariun-Erdene (MGL); W Activity	Issa (IRQ); W Throw	Choi (KOR); L Activity	2nd place, silver medalist(s)
Vahid Hassanzadeh; Yousef Karimian; Ehsan Karimian	Mixed team	Bye	Uzbekistan; L 0–5	Did not advance		5

=== Beach sepak takraw ===
Athlete	Event	Preliminary round / Round robin				Semifinal	Final	Rank
Athlete	Event	Round 1	Round 2	Round 3	Rank	Semifinal	Final	Rank
Hassan Alizadeh; Amir Khani; Vahid Ebrahimi; Mohammad Safaei Majd; Vahid Maleki; Abdolnaser Pangh	Men's regu	Thailand; L 0–2 (8–21, 3–21)	Brunei; W 2–1 (21–19, 7–21, 21–15)	—N/a	2 Q	Indonesia; L 0–2 (20–22, 12–21)	Did not advance	3rd place, bronze medalist(s)
Hassan Alizadeh; Amir Khani; Vahid Ebrahimi; Saman Jahantigh; Mohammad Safaei Majd; Vahid Maleki; Ali Azizabadi; Saeid Asiaban; Mehrdad Jafari; Pedram Khodadadeh; Abdolnaser Pangh; Omid Hassani	Men's team regu	Thailand; L 0–2 (0–2, 0–2)	India; W 2–1 (2–1, 1–2, 2–0)	South Korea; L 1–2 (1–2, 2–0, 0–2)	3rd place, bronze medalist(s)	—N/a		

=== Beach soccer ===
Team	Event	Preliminary round			Quarterfinal	Semifinal	Final	Rank
Team	Event	Round 1	Round 2	Rank	Quarterfinal	Semifinal	Final	Rank
Iran	Men	Syria; W 9–3	Oman; L 1–5	2 Q	Thailand; W 3–1	United Arab Emirates; W 4–4 (3–1 P)	Japan; W 4–3	1st place, gold medalist(s)
Roster: Peyman Hosseini; Amir Hossein Akbari; Hassan Abdollahi; Mehdi Hassani; Ali Naderi; Shahriar Mojdeh; Farid Boloukbashi; Mohammad Ali Mokhtari; Mohammad Ahmadzadeh; Hamid Behzadpour; Coach: (Brazil) Marco Octávio

=== Beach volleyball ===
Athlete	Event	Preliminary round					Round of 32	Round of 16	Quarterfinal	Semifinal	Final	Rank
Athlete	Event	Round 1	Round 2	Round 3	Round 4	Rank	Round of 32	Round of 16	Quarterfinal	Semifinal	Final	Rank
Saber Houshmand; Bahman Salemi	Men	Hallyýew and Gaýypow (TKM); W 2–0 (21–8, 21–14)	Hammad and Al-Mohsen (BRN); W 2–1 (16–21, 21–19, 15–7)	Abdul Wahid and Naseer (MDV); W 2–0 (21–10, 23–21)	Abdelrasoul and Khallouf (QAT); W 2–1 (17–21, 21–15, 17–15)	1 Q	Bye	Al-Shereiqi and Al-Housni (OMA); W 2–0 (21–19, 21–16)	Sangkhachot and Inkiew (THA); W 2–0 (21–11, 21–11)	Yakovlev and Kuleshov (KAZ); W 2–1 (17–21, 21–14, 15–12)	Rachmawan and Darkuncoro (INA); L 1–2 (22–20, 14–21, 10–15)	2nd place, silver medalist(s)
Iman Karaminejad; Abdolhamed Mirzaali	Men	Sangkhachot and Inkiew (THA); W 2–1 (21–23, 23–21, 16–14)	Mohammad and Safi (AFG); W WO	Marhoon and Qarqoor (BRN); L 1–2 (21–19, 16–21, 12–15)	Hasegawa and Ageba (JPN); L 1–2 (18–21, 21–18, 14–16)	4	Did not advance					25

=== Beach wrestling ===
Athlete	Event	Group round				Semifinal	Final	Rank
Athlete	Event	Round 1	Round 2	Round 3	Rank	Semifinal	Final	Rank
Mohammad Naderi	Men's 70 kg	Park (KOR); W 2–1	Dipu (BAN); W 2–0	Azbileg (MGL); W Fall (2–0)	1 Q	Bekzhanov (KAZ); W 2–0	Ibrahim (QAT); W 2–0	1st place, gold medalist(s)
Kamran Hosseinijam	Men's 80 kg	Trần (VIE); W 2–0	Lee (KOR); W 2–0	Chon (CAM); W 2–0	1 Q	Butt (PAK); W 2–1	Baýramow (TKM); W 2–0	1st place, gold medalist(s)
Jaber Sadeghzadeh	Men's +80 kg	Go (KOR); W 2–0	Abdrashev (KAZ); W WO	Phachanxay (LAO); W Fall (3–0)	1 Q	Inam (PAK); W Fall (2–1)	Kushubakov (KGZ); W 2–0	1st place, gold medalist(s)

=== Bodybuilding ===
Athlete	Event	Prejudging		Final	
Athlete	Event	Score	Rank	Score	Rank
Rouhollah Mirnourollahi	Men's 168 cm	12	2 Q	25	2nd place, silver medalist(s)
Javad Soltani	Men's 172 cm	8	1 Q	15	1st place, gold medalist(s)

=== Extreme sports ===
==== Aggressive inline ====
Athlete	Event	Preliminary		Final	
Athlete	Event	Score	Rank	Score	Rank
Ardeshir Ghovanloupour	Open big air	—N/a		4.10 m	4
Ardeshir Ghovanloupour	Open park	57.00	7 Q	62.00	8
Ardeshir Ghovanloupour	Open park best trick	—N/a		—N/a	4

==== Skateboarding ====
Athlete	Event	Preliminary		Round of 16	Quarterfinals	Semifinals	Final	Rank
Athlete	Event	Score	Rank	Round of 16	Quarterfinals	Semifinals	Final	Rank
Mohammad Javad Rahimi	Open park	65.33	8 Q	—N/a			Score: 71.33	8
Mohammad Javad Rahimi	Open park best trick	—N/a					—N/a	8
Mohammad Javad Rahimi	Open Game of Skate	—N/a		Tang (HKG); L SKATE–0	Did not advance			9

==== Sport climbing ====
Athlete	Event	Qualification		Quarterfinal	Semifinal	Final	Rank
Athlete	Event	Time	Rank	Quarterfinal	Semifinal	Final	Rank
Reza Alipour	Men's speed	DSQ	—	Did not advance			—
Hamid Reza Touzandeh	Men's speed	6.91	5 Q	Maimuratov (KAZ); W 6.73–6.85	Jaelolo (INA); L 6.64–6.31	3rd place match Khaibullin (KAZ); L Fall–12.60	4
Reza Alipour; Artimes Farshad Yeganeh; Hamid Reza Touzandeh	Men's speed relay	45.08	7	—N/a	Did not advance		7

=== Footvolley ===
Athlete	Event	Preliminary round				Semifinal	Final	Rank
Athlete	Event	Round 1	Round 2	Round 3	Rank	Semifinal	Final	Rank
Hamed Shadan; Majid Salmani	Men	South Korea; W 2–0 (18–13, 18–5)	Vietnam; W 2–0 (18–9, 18–11)	Thailand; L RET (6–18, 3–13)	2 Q	United Arab Emirates; W 2–0 (18–10, 18–12)	Thailand; L 0–2 (8–18, 11–18)	2nd place, silver medalist(s)

=== Ju-jitsu ===
Ne-waza

Athlete	Event	Round of 16	Quarterfinal	Semifinal	Final	Rank
Ahmad Reza Eidi	Men's 60 kg	Momunow (TKM); W WO	Ziade (LIB); W 8–0	Antar (YEM); W 6–0	Batgal (MGL); L 0–2	2nd place, silver medalist(s)
Mehran Sattar	Men's 60 kg	Al-Faraj (KUW); L 2–6	Did not advance			9
Ali Hassanpour	Men's 70 kg	Khan (PAK); W SUB	Lê (VIE); L SUB	Repechage; Somboon (THA); L 0–0	Did not advance	7
Amir Hossein Khademian	Men's 70 kg	Din (PAK); W 11–0	Danh (VIE); W SUB	Al-Darai (UAE); W 2–0	Al-Kirbi (UAE); L SUB	2nd place, silver medalist(s)
Mohammad Mansouri Davar	Men's 80 kg	Aýrapetýan (TKM); W SUB	Anjum (PAK); W SUB	Baylon (PHI); W 0–0	Balhol (UAE); L SUB	2nd place, silver medalist(s)
Ali Sirousi	Men's 80 kg	Ariuntsog (MGL); L SUB	Did not advance			9
Iraj Amirkhani	Men's 90 kg	Madaminow (TKM); W 24–0	Butt (PAK); W 8–2	Al-Ketbi (UAE); L 0–4	3rd place match Elias (LIB); L 0–0	5
Mohammad Hossein Mansouri	Men's 90 kg	Bye	Bold-Erdene (MGL); L SUB	Repechage; Elias (LIB); L SUB	Did not advance	7
Ali Asghar Dokouhaki	Men's +90 kg	Al-Nuaimi (UAE); W SUB	Al-Mulla (KUW); L SUB	Repechage; Nguyễn (VIE); W SUB	3rd place match Chidsin (THA); W 2–2	3rd place, bronze medalist(s)
Iraj Amirkhani	Men's openweight	Bold-Erdene (MGL); W 0–0	Elias (LIB); L 0–2	Repechage; Chidsin (THA); W SUB	3rd place match Butt (PAK); W SUB	3rd place, bronze medalist(s)
Ali Asghar Dokouhaki	Men's openweight	Bye	Butt (PAK); L 2–4	Repechage; Ali (KUW); L SUB	Did not advance	7

=== Muaythai ===
Athlete	Event	Round of 16	Quarterfinal	Semifinal	Final	Rank
Yasin Ahmadi	Men's 57 kg	—N/a	Yang (CHN); W 5–0	Nguyễn (VIE); L 0–5	Did not advance	3rd place, bronze medalist(s)
Payam Malekmohammadi	Men's 60 kg	—N/a	Artwichian (THA); L 0–5	Did not advance		5
Kaveh Soleimani	Men's 67 kg	Bye	Gu (CHN); W 5–0	Amirzhanov (KAZ); W 5–0	Hasan (IRQ); W 5–0	1st place, gold medalist(s)
Masoud Minaei	Men's 71 kg	Tuhtaboev (UZB); W KO	Surichay (THA); L 1–4	Did not advance		5
Hossein Karami	Men's 75 kg	—N/a	Tolipov (UZB); W 5–0	Zaspa (PHI); W 5–0	Loparev (KAZ); L 2–3	2nd place, silver medalist(s)
Mahmoud Sattari	Men's 81 kg	Sovetbekov (KGZ); W KO	Al-Barri (JOR); W 5–0	El-Khatib (LIB); W WO	Kazimov (UZB); L 0–5	2nd place, silver medalist(s)

=== Squash ===
Athlete	Event	Round of 16	Quarterfinal	Semifinal	Final	Rank
Navid Maleksabet	Men's singles	Al-Hendawi (QAT); W 2–1 (4–7, 7–2, 7–1)	Sandhu (IND); L 0–2 (1–7, 2–7)	Did not advance		5
Farzad Shokouhi	Men's singles	Shoukat (PAK); L 1–2 (7–4, 2–7, 6–7)	Did not advance			9

=== Triathlon ===
==== Duathlon ====
Athlete	Event	Time	Rank
Mohammad Hosseini	Men's sprint	59:18	7
Sasan Malmir	Men's sprint	59:28	9

==== Triathlon ====
Athlete	Event	Time	Rank
Ehsan Aminian	Men's sprint	1:01:34	20
Salman Teymouri	Men's sprint	59:06	13
