= Beach volleyball at the 2014 Asian Beach Games =

- Venue: Karon Beach
- Dates: 16–23 November 2014

Beach volleyball competition at the 2014 Asian Beach Games was held in Phuket, Thailand from 16 to 23 November 2014 at Karon Beach, Phuket.

== Medalists ==
Event	Gold	Silver	Bronze
Men	Indonesia; Ade Candra Rachmawan; Koko Prasetyo Darkuncoro	Iran; Saber Houshmand; Bahman Salemi	Qatar; Mahmoud Assam; Jefferson Pereira
Women	Kazakhstan; Tatyana Mashkova; Irina Tsimbalova	Thailand; Varapatsorn Radarong; Tanarattha Udomchavee	Indonesia; Putu Dini Jasita Utami; Dhita Juliana

== Medal table ==
Rank	Nation	Gold	Silver	Bronze	Total
1	Indonesia (INA)	1	0	1	2
2	Kazakhstan (KAZ)	1	0	0	1
3	Iran (IRI)	0	1	0	1
3	Thailand (THA)	0	1	0	1
5	Qatar (QAT)	0	0	1	1
Totals (5 entries)		2	2	2	6

== Results ==
=== Men ===
==== Preliminary ====
===== Pool A =====
Pos	Team	Pld	W	L	Pts	SW	SL	SR	SPW	SPL	SPR
1	Yakovlev–Kuleshov (KAZ)	4	4	0	8	8	1	8.000	180	132	1.364
2	Kumara–Ekanayaka (SRI)	4	3	1	7	6	2	3.000	155	138	1.123
3	Nordin–Khoo (MAS)	4	2	2	6	5	5	1.000	170	172	0.988
4	Fares–Abi Chedid (LIB)	4	1	3	5	3	7	0.429	170	188	0.904
5	Soares–Santos (TLS)	4	0	4	4	1	8	0.125	138	183	0.754

Source: AVC

Date		Score		Set 1	Set 2	Set 3
16 Nov	Yakovlev–Kuleshov (KAZ)	2–0	Fares–Abi Chedid (LIB)	21–19	21–18	
16 Nov	Nordin–Khoo (MAS)	2–0	Soares–Santos (TLS)	21–14	21–17	
17 Nov	Kumara–Ekanayaka (SRI)	2–0	Soares–Santos (TLS)	21–11	23–21	
17 Nov	Nordin–Khoo (MAS)	2–1	Fares–Abi Chedid (LIB)	17–21	21–17	15–7
18 Nov	Yakovlev–Kuleshov (KAZ)	2–0	Kumara–Ekanayaka (SRI)	21–8	21–19	
18 Nov	Soares–Santos (TLS)	1–2	Fares–Abi Chedid (LIB)	16–21	21–18	14–16
19 Nov	Yakovlev–Kuleshov (KAZ)	2–0	Soares–Santos (TLS)	21–11	21–13	
19 Nov	Nordin–Khoo (MAS)	0–2	Kumara–Ekanayaka (SRI)	19–21	12–21	
20 Nov	Kumara–Ekanayaka (SRI)	2–0	Fares–Abi Chedid (LIB)	21–15	21–18	
20 Nov	Yakovlev–Kuleshov (KAZ)	2–1	Nordin–Khoo (MAS)	21–10	18–21	15–13

===== Pool B =====
Pos	Team	Pld	W	L	Pts	SW	SL	SR	SPW	SPL	SPR
1	Assam–Pereira (QAT)	4	4	0	8	8	1	8.000	179	110	1.627
2	Nguyễn–Nguyễn (VIE)	4	3	1	7	6	3	2.000	168	117	1.436
3	Sim–Lim (CAM)	4	2	2	6	5	4	1.250	168	129	1.302
4	El-Azzi–Saliba (LIB)	4	1	3	5	3	6	0.500	146	137	1.066
5	Hassouna–Abujaser (PLE)	4	0	4	0	0	8	0.000	0	0	—

Source: AVC

Date		Score		Set 1	Set 2	Set 3
16 Nov	Assam–Pereira (QAT)	2–0	El-Azzi–Saliba (LIB)	21–12	21–19	
16 Nov	Nguyễn–Nguyễn (VIE)	2–0	Hassouna–Abujaser (PLE)	Walkover		
17 Nov	Sim–Lim (CAM)	2–0	Hassouna–Abujaser (PLE)	Walkover		
17 Nov	Nguyễn–Nguyễn (VIE)	2–1	El-Azzi–Saliba (LIB)	17–21	21–9	15–9
18 Nov	Hassouna–Abujaser (PLE)	0–2	El-Azzi–Saliba (LIB)	Walkover		
18 Nov	Assam–Pereira (QAT)	2–1	Sim–Lim (CAM)	21–14	17–21	15–13
19 Nov	Nguyễn–Nguyễn (VIE)	2–0	Sim–Lim (CAM)	21–17	21–19	
19 Nov	Assam–Pereira (QAT)	2–0	Hassouna–Abujaser (PLE)	Walkover		
20 Nov	Sim–Lim (CAM)	2–0	El-Azzi–Saliba (LIB)	21–19	21–15	
20 Nov	Assam–Pereira (QAT)	2–0	Nguyễn–Nguyễn (VIE)	21–16	21–15	

===== Pool C =====
Pos	Team	Pld	W	L	Pts	SW	SL	SR	SPW	SPL	SPR
1	Bogatu–Pustynnikov (KAZ)	4	4	0	8	8	1	8.000	186	146	1.274
2	Wu–Yang (CHN)	4	3	1	7	7	2	3.500	177	153	1.157
3	Nishimura–Tsuchiya (JPN)	4	2	2	6	4	4	1.000	163	146	1.116
4	Nguyễn–Võ (VIE)	4	1	3	5	2	6	0.333	134	156	0.859
5	Xavier–Correia (TLS)	4	0	4	4	0	8	0.000	109	168	0.649

Source: AVC

Date		Score		Set 1	Set 2	Set 3
16 Nov	Wu–Yang (CHN)	2–0	Nguyễn–Võ (VIE)	21–18	21–17	
16 Nov	Bogatu–Pustynnikov (KAZ)	2–0	Nishimura–Tsuchiya (JPN)	21–17	27–25	
17 Nov	Xavier–Correia (TLS)	0–2	Nishimura–Tsuchiya (JPN)	10–21	16–21	
17 Nov	Bogatu–Pustynnikov (KAZ)	2–0	Nguyễn–Võ (VIE)	21–13	21–16	
18 Nov	Wu–Yang (CHN)	2–0	Xavier–Correia (TLS)	21–10	21–17	
18 Nov	Nishimura–Tsuchiya (JPN)	2–0	Nguyễn–Võ (VIE)	21–14	21–14	
19 Nov	Bogatu–Pustynnikov (KAZ)	2–0	Xavier–Correia (TLS)	21–13	21–13	
19 Nov	Wu–Yang (CHN)	2–0	Nishimura–Tsuchiya (JPN)	23–21	21–16	
20 Nov	Xavier–Correia (TLS)	0–2	Nguyễn–Võ (VIE)	16–21	14–21	
20 Nov	Wu–Yang (CHN)	1–2	Bogatu–Pustynnikov (KAZ)	16–21	21–18	12–15

===== Pool D =====
Pos	Team	Pld	W	L	Pts	SW	SL	SR	SPW	SPL	SPR
1	Houshmand–Salemi (IRI)	4	4	0	8	8	2	4.000	193	151	1.278
2	Abdelrasoul–Khallouf (QAT)	4	3	1	7	7	3	2.333	187	153	1.222
3	Hammad–Al-Mohsen (BRN)	4	2	2	6	6	4	1.500	182	166	1.096
4	Abdul Wahid–Naseer (MDV)	4	1	3	5	2	7	0.286	143	176	0.813
5	Hallyýew–Gaýypow (TKM)	4	0	4	4	1	8	0.125	121	180	0.672

Source: AVC

Date		Score		Set 1	Set 2	Set 3
16 Nov	Abdelrasoul–Khallouf (QAT)	2–1	Hammad–Al-Mohsen (BRN)	15–21	22–20	15–10
16 Nov	Houshmand–Salemi (IRI)	2–0	Hallyýew–Gaýypow (TKM)	21–8	21–14	
17 Nov	Abdul Wahid–Naseer (MDV)	2–1	Hallyýew–Gaýypow (TKM)	18–21	21–18	15–9
17 Nov	Houshmand–Salemi (IRI)	2–1	Hammad–Al-Mohsen (BRN)	16–21	21–19	15–7
18 Nov	Abdelrasoul–Khallouf (QAT)	2–0	Abdul Wahid–Naseer (MDV)	21–13	21–14	
18 Nov	Hallyýew–Gaýypow (TKM)	0–2	Hammad–Al-Mohsen (BRN)	16–21	15–21	
19 Nov	Houshmand–Salemi (IRI)	2–0	Abdul Wahid–Naseer (MDV)	21–10	23–21	
19 Nov	Abdelrasoul–Khallouf (QAT)	2–0	Hallyýew–Gaýypow (TKM)	21–11	21–9	
20 Nov	Abdelrasoul–Khallouf (QAT)	1–2	Houshmand–Salemi (IRI)	21–17	15–21	15–17
20 Nov	Abdul Wahid–Naseer (MDV)	0–2	Hammad–Al-Mohsen (BRN)	17–21	14–21	

===== Pool E =====
Pos	Team	Pld	W	L	Pts	SW	SL	SR	SPW	SPL	SPR
1	Sangkhachot–Inkiew (THA)	4	3	1	7	7	3	2.333	187	142	1.317
2	Hasegawa–Ageba (JPN)	4	3	1	7	7	3	2.333	186	131	1.420
3	Marhoon–Qarqoor (BRN)	4	2	2	6	4	5	0.800	165	133	1.241
4	Karaminejad–Mirzaali (IRI)	4	2	2	6	6	5	1.200	204	168	1.214
5	Mohammad–Safi (AFG)	4	0	4	0	0	8	0.000	0	0	—

Source: AVC

Date		Score		Set 1	Set 2	Set 3
16 Nov	Hasegawa–Ageba (JPN)	2–0	Marhoon–Qarqoor (BRN)	21–16	21–17	
16 Nov	Sangkhachot–Inkiew (THA)	1–2	Karaminejad–Mirzaali (IRI)	23–21	21–23	14–16
17 Nov	Sangkhachot–Inkiew (THA)	2–0	Marhoon–Qarqoor (BRN)	21–19	21–16	
17 Nov	Mohammad–Safi (AFG)	0–2	Karaminejad–Mirzaali (IRI)	Walkover		
18 Nov	Hasegawa–Ageba (JPN)	2–0	Mohammad–Safi (AFG)	Walkover		
18 Nov	Karaminejad–Mirzaali (IRI)	1–2	Marhoon–Qarqoor (BRN)	21–19	16–21	12–15
19 Nov	Sangkhachot–Inkiew (THA)	2–0	Mohammad–Safi (AFG)	Walkover		
19 Nov	Hasegawa–Ageba (JPN)	2–1	Karaminejad–Mirzaali (IRI)	21–18	18–21	16–14
20 Nov	Hasegawa–Ageba (JPN)	1–2	Sangkhachot–Inkiew (THA)	21–9	18–21	8–15
20 Nov	Mohammad–Safi (AFG)	0–2	Marhoon–Qarqoor (BRN)	Walkover		

===== Pool F =====
Pos	Team	Pld	W	L	Pts	SW	SL	SR	SPW	SPL	SPR
1	Rachmawan–Darkuncoro (INA)	5	5	0	10	10	0	MAX	210	106	1.981
2	Wong–Chui (HKG)	5	4	1	9	8	2	4.000	213	146	1.459
3	Bonono–Ybanez (PHI)	5	3	2	8	6	4	1.500	202	147	1.374
4	Razzaq–Raza (PAK)	5	2	3	7	4	6	0.667	168	151	1.113
5	Abdul Hameed–Nihad (MDV)	5	1	4	6	2	8	0.250	135	168	0.804
6	Al-Arqan–Tafesh (PLE)	5	0	5	0	0	10	0.000	0	0	—

Source: AVC

Date		Score		Set 1	Set 2	Set 3
16 Nov	Rachmawan–Darkuncoro (INA)	2–0	Al-Arqan–Tafesh (PLE)	Walkover		
16 Nov	Wong–Chui (HKG)	2–0	Razzaq–Raza (PAK)	21–18	21–12	
16 Nov	Bonono–Ybanez (PHI)	2–0	Abdul Hameed–Nihad (MDV)	21–9	21–12	
16 Nov	Razzaq–Raza (PAK)	2–0	Al-Arqan–Tafesh (PLE)	Walkover		
16 Nov	Rachmawan–Darkuncoro (INA)	2–0	Abdul Hameed–Nihad (MDV)	21–8	21–13	
16 Nov	Wong–Chui (HKG)	2–0	Bonono–Ybanez (PHI)	21–16	33–31	
17 Nov	Rachmawan–Darkuncoro (INA)	2–0	Razzaq–Raza (PAK)	21–6	21–18	
17 Nov	Wong–Chui (HKG)	2–0	Abdul Hameed–Nihad (MDV)	21–19	21–8	
17 Nov	Bonono–Ybanez (PHI)	2–0	Al-Arqan–Tafesh (PLE)	Walkover		
18 Nov	Abdul Hameed–Nihad (MDV)	0–2	Razzaq–Raza (PAK)	14–21	10–21	
18 Nov	Wong–Chui (HKG)	2–0	Al-Arqan–Tafesh (PLE)	Walkover		
18 Nov	Rachmawan–Darkuncoro (INA)	2–0	Bonono–Ybanez (PHI)	21–15	21–13	
19 Nov	Rachmawan–Darkuncoro (INA)	2–0	Wong–Chui (HKG)	21–17	21–16	
19 Nov	Bonono–Ybanez (PHI)	2–0	Razzaq–Raza (PAK)	21–10	22–20	
19 Nov	Abdul Hameed–Nihad (MDV)	2–0	Al-Arqan–Tafesh (PLE)	Walkover		

===== Pool G =====
Pos	Team	Pld	W	L	Pts	SW	SL	SR	SPW	SPL	SPR
1	Li–Zhang (CHN)	5	5	0	10	10	0	MAX	210	140	1.500
2	Becaldo–Tipgos (PHI)	5	4	1	9	8	5	1.600	221	216	1.023
3	Santosa–Fahriansyah (INA)	5	3	2	8	7	5	1.400	215	198	1.086
4	Yapa–Weliweriya (SRI)	5	2	3	7	5	6	0.833	198	195	1.015
5	Al-Subhi–Al-Hashmi (OMA)	5	1	4	6	4	8	0.500	195	217	0.899
6	Nuryýew–Atajanow (TKM)	5	0	5	5	0	10	0.000	140	213	0.657

Source: AVC

Date		Score		Set 1	Set 2	Set 3
16 Nov	Li–Zhang (CHN)	2–0	Nuryýew–Atajanow (TKM)	21–11	21–8	
16 Nov	Santosa–Fahriansyah (INA)	2–0	Yapa–Weliweriya (SRI)	21–19	21–14	
16 Nov	Becaldo–Tipgos (PHI)	2–1	Al-Subhi–Al-Hashmi (OMA)	16–21	21–13	15–11
17 Nov	Li–Zhang (CHN)	2–0	Yapa–Weliweriya (SRI)	21–15	21–14	
17 Nov	Santosa–Fahriansyah (INA)	2–1	Al-Subhi–Al-Hashmi (OMA)	21–19	15–21	15–8
17 Nov	Becaldo–Tipgos (PHI)	2–0	Nuryýew–Atajanow (TKM)	21–16	21–16	
17 Nov	Yapa–Weliweriya (SRI)	2–0	Nuryýew–Atajanow (TKM)	21–12	24–22	
17 Nov	Santosa–Fahriansyah (INA)	1–2	Becaldo–Tipgos (PHI)	13–21	21–13	14–16
17 Nov	Li–Zhang (CHN)	2–0	Al-Subhi–Al-Hashmi (OMA)	21–14	21–16	
18 Nov	Li–Zhang (CHN)	2–0	Becaldo–Tipgos (PHI)	21–15	21–15	
18 Nov	Santosa–Fahriansyah (INA)	2–0	Nuryýew–Atajanow (TKM)	21–13	21–12	
18 Nov	Al-Subhi–Al-Hashmi (OMA)	0–2	Yapa–Weliweriya (SRI)	12–21	18–21	
19 Nov	Li–Zhang (CHN)	2–0	Santosa–Fahriansyah (INA)	21–19	21–13	
19 Nov	Becaldo–Tipgos (PHI)	2–1	Yapa–Weliweriya (SRI)	21–17	11–21	15–11
19 Nov	Al-Subhi–Al-Hashmi (OMA)	2–0	Nuryýew–Atajanow (TKM)	21–15	21–15	

===== Pool H =====
Pos	Team	Pld	W	L	Pts	SW	SL	SR	SPW	SPL	SPR
1	Yungtin–Sukto (THA)	5	5	0	10	10	0	MAX	210	100	2.100
2	Al-Shereiqi–Al-Housni (OMA)	5	4	1	9	8	2	4.000	204	124	1.645
3	Juan–Wang (TPE)	5	3	2	8	6	5	1.200	202	138	1.464
4	Rahman–Zabir (BAN)	5	2	3	7	5	6	0.833	180	159	1.132
5	Fazlonshoev–Nazaramonov (TJK)	5	1	4	6	2	8	0.250	103	168	0.613
6	Shamsi–Meyagul (AFG)	5	0	5	0	0	10	0.000	0	0	—

Source: AVC

Date		Score		Set 1	Set 2	Set 3
16 Nov	Yungtin–Sukto (THA)	2–0	Fazlonshoev–Nazaramonov (TJK)	21–8	21–5	
16 Nov	Al-Shereiqi–Al-Housni (OMA)	2–0	Rahman–Zabir (BAN)	21–13	21–19	
16 Nov	Juan–Wang (TPE)	2–0	Shamsi–Meyagul (AFG)	Walkover		
17 Nov	Juan–Wang (TPE)	2–0	Fazlonshoev–Nazaramonov (TJK)	21–5	21–8	
17 Nov	Yungtin–Sukto (THA)	2–0	Rahman–Zabir (BAN)	21–11	21–12	
17 Nov	Al-Shereiqi–Al-Housni (OMA)	2–0	Shamsi–Meyagul (AFG)	Walkover		
18 Nov	Al-Shereiqi–Al-Housni (OMA)	2–0	Juan–Wang (TPE)	21–18	21–17	
18 Nov	Rahman–Zabir (BAN)	2–0	Fazlonshoev–Nazaramonov (TJK)	21–10	21–10	
18 Nov	Yungtin–Sukto (THA)	2–0	Shamsi–Meyagul (AFG)	Walkover		
18 Nov	Yungtin–Sukto (THA)	2–0	Juan–Wang (TPE)	21–16	21–12	
18 Nov	Al-Shereiqi–Al-Housni (OMA)	2–0	Fazlonshoev–Nazaramonov (TJK)	21–9	21–6	
18 Nov	Shamsi–Meyagul (AFG)	0–2	Rahman–Zabir (BAN)	Walkover		
19 Nov	Yungtin–Sukto (THA)	2–0	Al-Shereiqi–Al-Housni (OMA)	21–17	21–19	
19 Nov	Juan–Wang (TPE)	2–1	Rahman–Zabir (BAN)	19–21	21–13	15–7
19 Nov	Shamsi–Meyagul (AFG)	0–2	Fazlonshoev–Nazaramonov (TJK)	Walkover		

==== Knockout round ====
Round of 32
Date		Score		Set 1	Set 2	Set 3
20 Nov	Nguyễn–Nguyễn (VIE)	2–1	Hammad–Al-Mohsen (BRN)	19–21	21–15	15–12
20 Nov	Kumara–Ekanayaka (SRI)	0–2	Santosa–Fahriansyah (INA)	18–21	14–21	
20 Nov	Becaldo–Tipgos (PHI)	2–1	Juan–Wang (TPE)	19–21	21–19	15–13
20 Nov	Al-Shereiqi–Al-Housni (OMA)	2–1	Sim–Lim (CAM)	16–21	21–17	15–11
20 Nov	Wong–Chui (HKG)	0–2	Nordin–Khoo (MAS)	18–21	22–24	
20 Nov	Wu–Yang (CHN)	2–0	Marhoon–Qarqoor (BRN)	21–10	21–17	
20 Nov	Hasegawa–Ageba (JPN)	2–1	Bonono–Ybanez (PHI)	19–21	21–14	15–11
20 Nov	Abdelrasoul–Khallouf (QAT)	0–2	Nishimura–Tsuchiya (JPN)	13–21	17–21	

Round of 16; 21 November
Yakovlev–Kuleshov (KAZ)	21	21
Nguyễn–Nguyễn (VIE)	19	17
Santosa–Fahriansyah (INA)	16	19
Yungtin–Sukto (THA)	21	21
Sangkhachot–Inkiew (THA)	21	21
Becaldo–Tipgos (PHI)	13	16
Al-Shereiqi–Al-Housni (OMA)	19	16
Houshmand–Salemi (IRI)	21	21
Bogatu–Pustynnikov (KAZ)	24	21
Nordin–Khoo (MAS)	22	16
Wu–Yang (CHN)	15	19
Rachmawan–Darkuncoro (INA)	21	21
Li–Zhang (CHN)	21	18	15
Hasegawa–Ageba (JPN)	14	21	7
Nishimura–Tsuchiya (JPN)	23	16	8
Assam–Pereira (QAT)	21	21	15

Quarterfinals; 21 November
Yakovlev–Kuleshov (KAZ)	21	21
Yungtin–Sukto (THA)	18	12
Sangkhachot–Inkiew (THA)	11	11
Houshmand–Salemi (IRI)	21	21
Bogatu–Pustynnikov (KAZ)	21	15	10
Rachmawan–Darkuncoro (INA)	19	21	15
Li–Zhang (CHN)	17	13
Assam–Pereira (QAT)	21	21

Semifinals; 22 November
Yakovlev–Kuleshov (KAZ)	21	14	12
Houshmand–Salemi (IRI)	17	21	15
Rachmawan–Darkuncoro (INA)	14	21	15
Assam–Pereira (QAT)	21	17	13

Gold medal match 23 November
Houshmand–Salemi (IRI)	22	14	10
Rachmawan–Darkuncoro (INA)	20	21	15
Bronze medal match
Yakovlev–Kuleshov (KAZ)	20	18
Assam–Pereira (QAT)	22	21

=== Women ===
==== Preliminary ====
===== Pool A =====
Pos	Team	Pld	W	L	Pts	SW	SL	SR	SPW	SPL	SPR
1	Radarong–Udomchavee (THA)	3	2	1	5	5	2	2.500	147	109	1.349
2	Habaguchi–Murakami (JPN)	3	2	1	5	4	2	2.000	121	95	1.274
3	Lin–Tang (CHN)	3	2	1	5	4	3	1.333	131	120	1.092
4	Nematullo–Nematullo (TJK)	3	0	3	3	0	6	0.000	51	126	0.405

Source: AVC

Date		Score		Set 1	Set 2	Set 3
16 Nov	Habaguchi–Murakami (JPN)	2–0	Lin–Tang (CHN)	21–14	21–18	
16 Nov	Radarong–Udomchavee (THA)	2–0	Nematullo–Nematullo (TJK)	21–4	21–11	
18 Nov	Radarong–Udomchavee (THA)	1–2	Lin–Tang (CHN)	21–12	24–26	17–19
18 Nov	Habaguchi–Murakami (JPN)	2–0	Nematullo–Nematullo (TJK)	21–8	21–12	
20 Nov	Radarong–Udomchavee (THA)	2–0	Habaguchi–Murakami (JPN)	21–17	22–20	
20 Nov	Lin–Tang (CHN)	2–0	Nematullo–Nematullo (TJK)	21–9	21–7	

===== Pool B =====
Pos	Team	Pld	W	L	Pts	SW	SL	SR	SPW	SPL	SPR
1	Mashkova–Tsimbalova (KAZ)	4	4	0	8	8	1	8.000	182	108	1.685
2	Utami–Juliana (INA)	4	3	1	7	7	2	3.500	173	120	1.442
3	Kou–Chang (TPE)	4	2	2	6	4	4	1.000	133	136	0.978
4	Trần–Ngô (VIE)	4	1	3	5	2	6	0.333	127	151	0.841
5	Sim–Ariffin (MAS)	4	0	4	4	0	8	0.000	68	168	0.405

Source: AVC

Date		Score		Set 1	Set 2	Set 3
16 Nov	Mashkova–Tsimbalova (KAZ)	2–0	Kou–Chang (TPE)	21–13	21–14	
16 Nov	Utami–Juliana (INA)	2–0	Sim–Ariffin (MAS)	21–5	21–9	
17 Nov	Utami–Juliana (INA)	2–0	Kou–Chang (TPE)	21–6	21–16	
17 Nov	Trần–Ngô (VIE)	2–0	Sim–Ariffin (MAS)	21–15	21–10	
18 Nov	Sim–Ariffin (MAS)	0–2	Kou–Chang (TPE)	7–21	9–21	
18 Nov	Mashkova–Tsimbalova (KAZ)	2–0	Trần–Ngô (VIE)	21–10	21–11	
19 Nov	Utami–Juliana (INA)	2–0	Trần–Ngô (VIE)	21–16	21–12	
19 Nov	Mashkova–Tsimbalova (KAZ)	2–0	Sim–Ariffin (MAS)	21–9	21–4	
20 Nov	Trần–Ngô (VIE)	0–2	Kou–Chang (TPE)	17–21	19–21	
20 Nov	Mashkova–Tsimbalova (KAZ)	2–1	Utami–Juliana (INA)	21–13	20–22	15–12

===== Pool C =====
Pos	Team	Pld	W	L	Pts	SW	SL	SR	SPW	SPL	SPR
1	Wang–Xia (CHN)	4	4	0	8	8	0	MAX	175	117	1.496
2	Nguyễn–Phạm (VIE)	4	3	1	7	6	2	3.000	162	140	1.157
3	Samalikova–Lassyuta (KAZ)	4	2	2	6	4	4	1.000	153	135	1.133
4	Siam–Dwiningtyas (INA)	4	1	3	5	2	6	0.333	141	158	0.892
5	Gunasinghe–Priyadarshani (SRI)	4	0	4	4	0	8	0.000	87	168	0.518

Source: AVC

Date		Score		Set 1	Set 2	Set 3
16 Nov	Wang–Xia (CHN)	2–0	Nguyễn–Phạm (VIE)	21–7	26–24	
16 Nov	Samalikova–Lassyuta (KAZ)	2–0	Siam–Dwiningtyas (INA)	21–17	21–16	
17 Nov	Gunasinghe–Priyadarshani (SRI)	0–2	Siam–Dwiningtyas (INA)	15–21	13–21	
17 Nov	Samalikova–Lassyuta (KAZ)	0–2	Nguyễn–Phạm (VIE)	13–21	20–22	
18 Nov	Wang–Xia (CHN)	2–0	Gunasinghe–Priyadarshani (SRI)	21–6	21–11	
18 Nov	Siam–Dwiningtyas (INA)	0–2	Nguyễn–Phạm (VIE)	10–21	23–25	
19 Nov	Samalikova–Lassyuta (KAZ)	2–0	Gunasinghe–Priyadarshani (SRI)	21–4	21–11	
19 Nov	Wang–Xia (CHN)	2–0	Siam–Dwiningtyas (INA)	21–19	21–14	
20 Nov	Wang–Xia (CHN)	2–0	Samalikova–Lassyuta (KAZ)	23–21	21–15	
20 Nov	Gunasinghe–Priyadarshani (SRI)	0–2	Nguyễn–Phạm (VIE)	17–21	10–21	

===== Pool D =====
Pos	Team	Pld	W	L	Pts	SW	SL	SR	SPW	SPL	SPR
1	Phokongploy–Tenpaksee (THA)	4	4	0	8	8	0	MAX	168	106	1.585
2	Luk–Beh (MAS)	4	3	1	7	6	4	1.500	183	159	1.151
3	Urata–Nagata (JPN)	4	2	2	6	5	4	1.250	166	165	1.006
4	Gunawardena–Prasadani (SRI)	4	1	3	5	2	7	0.286	142	181	0.785
5	Ng–Wong (HKG)	4	0	4	4	2	8	0.250	148	196	0.755

Source: AVC

Date		Score		Set 1	Set 2	Set 3
16 Nov	Phokongploy–Tenpaksee (THA)	2–0	Gunawardena–Prasadani (SRI)	21–7	21–10	
16 Nov	Ng–Wong (HKG)	0–2	Urata–Nagata (JPN)	17–21	11–21	
17 Nov	Ng–Wong (HKG)	1–2	Gunawardena–Prasadani (SRI)	24–22	17–21	9–15
17 Nov	Luk–Beh (MAS)	2–1	Urata–Nagata (JPN)	21–10	18–21	15–12
18 Nov	Phokongploy–Tenpaksee (THA)	2–0	Luk–Beh (MAS)	21–18	21–15	
18 Nov	Urata–Nagata (JPN)	2–0	Gunawardena–Prasadani (SRI)	21–17	26–24	
19 Nov	Phokongploy–Tenpaksee (THA)	2–0	Urata–Nagata (JPN)	21–16	21–18	
19 Nov	Ng–Wong (HKG)	1–2	Luk–Beh (MAS)	18–21	21–18	9–15
20 Nov	Phokongploy–Tenpaksee (THA)	2–0	Ng–Wong (HKG)	21–9	21–13	
20 Nov	Luk–Beh (MAS)	2–0	Gunawardena–Prasadani (SRI)	21–8	21–18	

==== Knockout round ====
Round of 16; 21 November
Radarong–Udomchavee (THA)	21	21
Gunawardena–Prasadani (SRI)	13	6
Luk–Beh (MAS)	21	18
Kou–Chang (TPE)	23	21
Nguyễn–Phạm (VIE)	20	14
Lin–Tang (CHN)	22	21
Siam–Dwiningtyas (INA)	9	15
Phokongploy–Tenpaksee (THA)	21	21
Wang–Xia (CHN)	19	21	13
Trần–Ngô (VIE)	21	14	15
Urata–Nagata (JPN)	15	15
Utami–Juliana (INA)	21	21
Habaguchi–Murakami (JPN)	19	18
Samalikova–Lassyuta (KAZ)	21	21
Nematullo–Nematullo (TJK)	5	7
Mashkova–Tsimbalova (KAZ)	21	21

Quarterfinals; 21 November
Radarong–Udomchavee (THA)	21	21
Kou–Chang (TPE)	19	19
Lin–Tang (CHN)	14	18
Phokongploy–Tenpaksee (THA)	21	21
Trần–Ngô (VIE)	14	12
Utami–Juliana (INA)	21	21
Samalikova–Lassyuta (KAZ)	12	16
Mashkova–Tsimbalova (KAZ)	21	21

Semifinals; 22 November
Radarong–Udomchavee (THA)	22	21
Phokongploy–Tenpaksee (THA)	20	13
Utami–Juliana (INA)	17	14
Mashkova–Tsimbalova (KAZ)	21	21

Gold medal match 23 November
Radarong–Udomchavee (THA)	13	21
Mashkova–Tsimbalova (KAZ)	21	23
Bronze medal match
Phokongploy–Tenpaksee (THA)	17	15
Utami–Juliana (INA)	21	21
