= Beach wrestling at the 2014 Asian Beach Games =

Wrestling competitions

- Venue: Patong Beach
- Dates: 15–17 November 2014

Beach wrestling competition at the 2014 Asian Beach Games was held in Phuket, Thailand from 15 to 17 November 2014 at Patong Beach.

== Medalists ==
=== Men ===
Event	Gold	Silver	Bronze
70 kg	Mohammad Naderi; Iran	Abdulrahman Ibrahim; Qatar	Nurlan Bekzhanov; Kazakhstan
70 kg	Mohammad Naderi; Iran	Abdulrahman Ibrahim; Qatar	Padipat Wantawong; Thailand
80 kg	Kamran Hosseinijam; Iran	Didar Baýramow; Turkmenistan	Muhammad Asad Butt; Pakistan
80 kg	Kamran Hosseinijam; Iran	Didar Baýramow; Turkmenistan	Baurzhan Izbassar; Kazakhstan
+80 kg	Jaber Sadeghzadeh; Iran	Bekbolsun Kushubakov; Kyrgyzstan	Muhammad Inam; Pakistan
+80 kg	Jaber Sadeghzadeh; Iran	Bekbolsun Kushubakov; Kyrgyzstan	Maher Al-Khayat; Syria

=== Women ===
Event	Gold	Silver	Bronze
50 kg	Hikaru Aono; Japan	Maliwan Muangpor; Thailand	Heka Maya Sari Sembiring; Indonesia
50 kg	Hikaru Aono; Japan	Maliwan Muangpor; Thailand	Nguyễn Thị Xuân; Vietnam
60 kg	Kim Kyeong-eun; South Korea	Nguyễn Thị Nga; Vietnam	Kanjana Thongkan; Thailand
60 kg	Kim Kyeong-eun; South Korea	Nguyễn Thị Nga; Vietnam	Ni Samnang; Cambodia
+60 kg	Olga Kalinina; Kazakhstan	Miku Saito; Japan	Banjong Poonmart; Thailand
+60 kg	Olga Kalinina; Kazakhstan	Miku Saito; Japan	Lương Thị Sâm; Vietnam

== Medal table ==
Rank	Nation	Gold	Silver	Bronze	Total
1	Iran (IRI)	3	0	0	3
2	Japan (JPN)	1	1	0	2
3	Kazakhstan (KAZ)	1	0	2	3
4	South Korea (KOR)	1	0	0	1
5	Thailand (THA)	0	1	3	4
6	Vietnam (VIE)	0	1	2	3
7	Kyrgyzstan (KGZ)	0	1	0	1
7	Qatar (QAT)	0	1	0	1
7	Turkmenistan (TKM)	0	1	0	1
10	Pakistan (PAK)	0	0	2	2
11	Cambodia (CAM)	0	0	1	1
11	Indonesia (INA)	0	0	1	1
11	Syria (SYR)	0	0	1	1
Totals (13 entries)		6	6	12	24

== Results ==
=== Men ===
==== 70 kg ====
15 November

===== Pools =====
Group A
Pos	Athlete	Pld	W	L	KAZ	SYR	TKM	CAM
1	Nurlan Bekzhanov (KAZ)	3	3	0	—	2–0	WO	2–0
2	Mohammad Shaikhouni (SYR)	3	2	1	0–2	—	2–1	2–0
3	Seýitnur Ataýew (TKM)	3	1	2		1–2	—	2–0
4	Kang Den Piseth (CAM)	3	0	3	0–2	0–2	0–2	—

Group B
Pos	Athlete	Pld	W	L	IRI	KOR	MGL	BAN
1	Mohammad Naderi (IRI)	3	3	0	—	2–1	Fall	2–0
2	Park Seong-un (KOR)	3	2	1	1–2	—	2–0	2–0
3	Tsengelbayaryn Azbileg (MGL)	3	1	2		0–2	—	Fall
4	Mohammad Dipu (BAN)	3	0	3	0–2	0–2		—

Group C
Pos	Athlete	Pld	W	L	THA	PHI	KGZ	VIE
1	Padipat Wantawong (THA)	3	3	0	—	2–1	2–0	2–0
2	Joseph Angana (PHI)	3	2	1	1–2	—	2–1	2–0
3	Elsuior Erik Uulu (KGZ)	3	1	2	0–2	1–2	—	Fall
4	Phan Bá Phương (VIE)	3	0	3	0–2	0–2		—

Group D
Pos	Athlete	Pld	W	L	QAT	JPN	PAK	INA	YEM
1	Abdulrahman Ibrahim (QAT)	4	3	1	—	0–2	Fall	Fall	2–0
2	Yoshihiro Hanada (JPN)	4	3	1	2–0	—	0–2	2–0	Fall
3	Ghulam Haider (PAK)	4	3	1		2–0	—	2–0	2–0
4	Ricky Fajar (INA)	4	1	3		0–2	0–2	—	2–1
5	Ibrahim Al-Yadomi (YEM)	4	0	4	0–2		0–2	1–2	—

Source: OCA

===== Final round =====
Semifinals
Nurlan Bekzhanov (KAZ)	0
Mohammad Naderi (IRI)	2
Padipat Wantawong (THA)	0
Abdulrahman Ibrahim (QAT)	2

Final
Mohammad Naderi (IRI)	2
Abdulrahman Ibrahim (QAT)	0
Bronze medal
Nurlan Bekzhanov (KAZ)	2
Padipat Wantawong (THA)	0

==== 80 kg ====
16 November

===== Pools =====
Group A
Pos	Athlete	Pld	W	L	PAK	MGL	LAO	KGZ
1	Muhammad Asad Butt (PAK)	3	3	0	—	2–1	Fall	2–0
2	Khultyn Mönkhjargal (MGL)	3	2	1	1–2	—	Fall	2–0
3	Khonekeo Thatthavong (LAO)	3	1	2			—	2–0
4	Bek Khaldar Uulu (KGZ)	3	0	3	0–2	0–2	0–2	—

Group B
Pos	Athlete	Pld	W	L	IRI	KOR	VIE	CAM
1	Kamran Hosseinijam (IRI)	3	3	0	—	2–0	2–0	2–0
2	Lee Seung-a (KOR)	3	2	1	0–2	—	2–0	2–0
3	Trần Văn Tuấn (VIE)	3	1	2	0–2	0–2	—	Fall
4	Chon Thoun (CAM)	3	0	3	0–2	0–2		—

Group C
Pos	Athlete	Pld	W	L	TKM	INA	BAN	PHI
1	Didar Baýramow (TKM)	3	3	0	—	2–0	2–0	2–1
2	Husnul Amri (INA)	3	2	1	0–2	—	2–0	2–0
3	Sheikh Shepon (BAN)	3	1	2	0–2	0–2	—	Fall
4	Smael Trazona (PHI)	3	0	3	1–2	0–2		—

Group D
Pos	Athlete	Pld	W	L	KAZ	THA	YEM	QAT
1	Baurzhan Izbassar (KAZ)	3	3	0	—	2–0	2–0	2–0
2	Tadsapol Pasawang (THA)	3	2	1	0–2	—	2–0	2–0
3	Mustafa Al-Haimi (YEM)	3	1	2	0–2	0–2	—	2–1
4	Bakhit Sharif Badr (QAT)	3	0	3	0–2	0–2	1–2	—

Source: OCA

===== Final round =====
Semifinals
Muhammad Asad Butt (PAK)	1
Kamran Hosseinijam (IRI)	2
Didar Baýramow (TKM)	2
Baurzhan Izbassar (KAZ)	1

Final
Kamran Hosseinijam (IRI)	2
Didar Baýramow (TKM)	0
Bronze medal
Muhammad Asad Butt (PAK)	2
Baurzhan Izbassar (KAZ)	0

==== +80 kg ====
17 November

===== Pools =====
Group A
Pos	Athlete	Pld	W	L	PAK	JPN	VIE	THA
1	Muhammad Inam (PAK)	3	3	0	—	Fall	2–0	2–0
2	Tomoyuki Oka (JPN)	3	2	1		—	Fall	2–0
3	Hà Văn Hiếu (VIE)	3	1	2	0–2		—	2–1
4	Anucha Yospanya (THA)	3	0	3	0–2	0–2	1–2	—

Group B
Pos	Athlete	Pld	W	L	IRI	LAO	KOR	KAZ
1	Jaber Sadeghzadeh (IRI)	3	3	0	—	Fall	2–0	WO
2	Phonexay Phachanxay (LAO)	3	2	1		—	WO	WO
3	Go Soung-jin (KOR)	3	0	3	0–2		—	WO
4	Yeraly Abdrashev (KAZ)	3	0	3			WO	—

Group C
Pos	Athlete	Pld	W	L	KGZ	QAT	PHI	CAM
1	Bekbolsun Kushubakov (KGZ)	3	3	0	—	2–0	WO	2–0
2	Jafar Khan (QAT)	3	2	1	0–2	—	Fall	2–0
3	Jason Balabal (PHI)	3	1	2			—	2–0
4	Chab Loeun (CAM)	3	0	3	0–2	0–2	0–2	—

Group D
Pos	Athlete	Pld	W	L	SYR	MGL	INA
1	Maher Al-Khayat (SYR)	2	2	0	—	2–0	2–1
2	Maamuugiin Tömörtogoo (MGL)	2	1	1	0–2	—	2–0
3	Samurung Siregar (INA)	2	0	2	1–2	0–2	—

Source: OCA

===== Final round =====
Semifinals
Muhammad Inam (PAK)
Jaber Sadeghzadeh (IRI)	Fall
Bekbolsun Kushubakov (KGZ)	2
Maher Al-Khayat (SYR)	0

Final
Jaber Sadeghzadeh (IRI)	2
Bekbolsun Kushubakov (KGZ)	0
Bronze medal
Muhammad Inam (PAK)	Fall
Maher Al-Khayat (SYR)

=== Women ===
==== 50 kg ====
15 November

Pos	Athlete	Pld	W	L	JPN	THA	INA	VIE	PHI	LAO
1	Hikaru Aono (JPN)	5	5	0	—	2–0	2–0	2–0	2–0	2–0
2	Maliwan Muangpor (THA)	5	3	2	0–2	—	2–1	2–0	1–2	Fall
3	Heka Maya Sari Sembiring (INA)	5	3	2	0–2	1–2	—	2–0	2–0	2–0
4	Nguyễn Thị Xuân (VIE)	5	2	3	0–2	0–2	0–2	—	2–0	Fall
5	Grace Loberanes (PHI)	5	2	3	0–2	2–1	0–2	0–2	—	2–0
6	Soumaly Phinith (LAO)	5	0	5	0–2		0–2		0–2	—

Source: OCA

==== 60 kg ====
16 November

===== Pools =====
Group A
Pos	Athlete	Pld	W	L	VIE	CAM	INA
1	Nguyễn Thị Nga (VIE)	2	2	0	—	2–0	2–0
2	Ni Samnang (CAM)	2	1	1	0–2	—	2–1
3	Sri Rahayu (INA)	2	0	2	0–2	1–2	—

Group B
Pos	Athlete	Pld	W	L	KOR	THA	KAZ	PHI
1	Kim Kyeong-eun (KOR)	3	3	0	—	2–0	2–1	2–0
2	Kanjana Thongkan (THA)	3	2	1	0–2	—	2–1	2–0
3	Miruyert Dynbayeva (KAZ)	3	1	2	1–2	1–2	—	2–0
4	Efralyn Crosby (PHI)	3	0	3	0–2	0–2	0–2	—

Source: OCA

===== Final round =====
Bronze medal
Ni Samnang (CAM)
Kanjana Thongkan (THA)	Fall

Final
Nguyễn Thị Nga (VIE)
Kim Kyeong-eun (KOR)	Fall

==== +60 kg ====
17 November

Pos	Athlete	Pld	W	L	KAZ	JPN	THA	VIE	INA	KOR
1	Olga Kalinina (KAZ)	5	5	0	—	2–0	2–0	2–1	2–1	Fall
2	Miku Saito (JPN)	5	4	1	0–2	—	2–0	2–1	2–1	2–0
3	Banjong Poonmart (THA)	5	3	2	0–2	0–2	—	2–0	2–1	2–0
4	Lương Thị Sâm (VIE)	5	2	3	1–2	1–2	0–2	—	Fall	2–0
5	Ridha Wahdaniaty (INA)	5	1	4	1–2	1–2	1–2		—	Ret
6	Oh Sae-na (KOR)	5	0	5		0–2	0–2	0–2		—

Source: OCA
