= Ju-jitsu at the 2014 Asian Beach Games =

- Venue: Karon Beach
- Dates: 12–13 November 2014

Ju-jitsu competition at the 2014 Asian Beach Games was held in Phuket, Thailand from 12 to 13 November 2014 at Karon Beach, Phuket. The rules were under ne-waza also widely known as Brazilian Jiu Jitsu.

== Medalists ==
=== Duo show ===
Event	Gold	Silver	Bronze
Men	Pakistan; Muhammad Ammar; Abu Hurraira Dhanani	Pakistan; Waheed-ud-Din; Shahzeb Nawaz Janjua	Thailand; Chatpimuk Chimklai; Thirathep Chimklai
Men	Pakistan; Muhammad Ammar; Abu Hurraira Dhanani	Pakistan; Waheed-ud-Din; Shahzeb Nawaz Janjua	Thailand; Jirayut Wuttiwannaphong; Jirayu Vongsawan
Women	Thailand; Suphawadee Kaeosrasaen; Kunsatri Kumsroi	Pakistan; Maryam; Sundus Salam Khan	Turkmenistan; Amina Halyllaýewa; Ruşana Nurjawowa
Women	Thailand; Suphawadee Kaeosrasaen; Kunsatri Kumsroi	Pakistan; Maryam; Sundus Salam Khan	Vietnam; Nguyễn Thị Thanh Thúy; Đào Lê Thu Trang
Mixed	Thailand; Ratcharat Yimprai; Arreewan Chansri	Pakistan; Muhammad Ammar; Sundus Salam Khan	Indonesia; Eko Hendrawan Sofyan; Lia Nurlianty Sofyan
Mixed	Thailand; Ratcharat Yimprai; Arreewan Chansri	Pakistan; Muhammad Ammar; Sundus Salam Khan	Vietnam; Lê Tiến Thành; Đào Lê Thu Trang

=== Men's ne-waza ===
Event	Gold	Silver	Bronze
−60 kg	Sumiyaagiin Batgal; Mongolia	Ahmad Reza Eidi; Iran	Sarawut Petsing; Thailand
−60 kg	Sumiyaagiin Batgal; Mongolia	Ahmad Reza Eidi; Iran	Ahmed Al-Maazmi; United Arab Emirates
−70 kg	Talib Al-Kirbi; United Arab Emirates	Amir Hossein Khademian; Iran	Mahmoud Geragh; Kuwait
−70 kg	Talib Al-Kirbi; United Arab Emirates	Amir Hossein Khademian; Iran	Ali Salem Al-Darai; United Arab Emirates
−80 kg	Khalfan Balhol; United Arab Emirates	Mohammad Mansouri Davar; Iran	Saoud Al-Hammadi; United Arab Emirates
−80 kg	Khalfan Balhol; United Arab Emirates	Mohammad Mansouri Davar; Iran	John Baylon; Philippines
−90 kg	Faisal Al-Ketbi; United Arab Emirates	Zayed Al-Kaabi; United Arab Emirates	Odsürengiin Bold-Erdene; Mongolia
−90 kg	Faisal Al-Ketbi; United Arab Emirates	Zayed Al-Kaabi; United Arab Emirates	Nacif Elias; Lebanon
+90 kg	Ahmed Butt; Pakistan	Natdanai Netthip; Thailand	Ali Asghar Dokouhaki; Iran
+90 kg	Ahmed Butt; Pakistan	Natdanai Netthip; Thailand	Abdullah Al-Mulla; Kuwait
Openweight	Faisal Al-Ketbi; United Arab Emirates	Khalfan Balhol; United Arab Emirates	Mohammad Ali; Kuwait
Openweight	Faisal Al-Ketbi; United Arab Emirates	Khalfan Balhol; United Arab Emirates	Iraj Amirkhani; Iran

=== Women's ne-waza ===
Event	Gold	Silver	Bronze
−50 kg	Maybelline Masuda; Philippines	Đào Lê Thu Trang; Vietnam	Hà Anh Thự; Vietnam
−50 kg	Maybelline Masuda; Philippines	Đào Lê Thu Trang; Vietnam	Tatchapan Srisamer; Thailand
−60 kg	Annie Ramirez; Philippines	Onanong Saengsirichok; Thailand	Nguyễn Thị Thanh Thúy; Vietnam
−60 kg	Annie Ramirez; Philippines	Onanong Saengsirichok; Thailand	Nguyễn Thị Quỳnh; Vietnam
+60 kg	Battsogtyn Buyandelger; Mongolia	Nguyễn Thị Hương; Vietnam	Wassanaporn Samthong; Thailand
+60 kg	Battsogtyn Buyandelger; Mongolia	Nguyễn Thị Hương; Vietnam	Nguyễn Thị Lan; Vietnam

== Medal table ==
Rank	Nation	Gold	Silver	Bronze	Total
1	United Arab Emirates (UAE)	4	2	3	9
2	Pakistan (PAK)	2	3	0	5
3	Thailand (THA)	2	2	5	9
4	Mongolia (MGL)	2	0	1	3
4	Philippines (PHI)	2	0	1	3
6	Iran (IRI)	0	3	2	5
7	Vietnam (VIE)	0	2	6	8
8	Kuwait (KUW)	0	0	3	3
9	Indonesia (INA)	0	0	1	1
9	Lebanon (LIB)	0	0	1	1
9	Turkmenistan (TKM)	0	0	1	1
Totals (11 entries)		12	12	24	48

== Results ==
=== Duo show ===
==== Men ====
12 November

1/4 finals
Jirayut Wuttiwannaphong (THA); Jirayu Vongsawan (THA)	35
Firman Monardi (INA); Eko Hendrawan Sofyan (INA)	33
Muhammad Ammar (PAK); Abu Hurraira Dhanani (PAK)	WO
Mohammed Hadi (IRQ); Murtadha Kamal (IRQ)
Waheed-ud-Din (PAK); Shahzeb Nawaz Janjua (PAK)	32
Samwel Aýrapetýan (TKM); Begli Meretgeldiýew (TKM)	26

Semifinals
Jirayut Wuttiwannaphong (THA); Jirayu Vongsawan (THA)	36
Muhammad Ammar (PAK); Abu Hurraira Dhanani (PAK)	37
Chatpimuk Chimklai (THA); Thirathep Chimklai (THA)	68
Waheed-ud-Din (PAK); Shahzeb Nawaz Janjua (PAK)	71

Gold medal
Muhammad Ammar (PAK); Abu Hurraira Dhanani (PAK)	35
Waheed-ud-Din (PAK); Shahzeb Nawaz Janjua (PAK)	34

Final of repechage
Firman Monardi (INA); Eko Hendrawan Sofyan (INA)	WO
Mohammed Hadi (IRQ); Murtadha Kamal (IRQ)

Bronze medals
Firman Monardi (INA); Eko Hendrawan Sofyan (INA)	34
Chatpimuk Chimklai (THA); Thirathep Chimklai (THA)	38
Samwel Aýrapetýan (TKM); Begli Meretgeldiýew (TKM)
Jirayut Wuttiwannaphong (THA); Jirayu Vongsawan (THA)	WO

==== Women ====
13 November

===== Preliminary round =====
Pool A
Pos	Team	Pld	W	L	Pts	PAK	VIE	PHI
1	Maryam (PAK) Sundus Salam Khan (PAK)	2	2	0	4	—	33–30	WO
2	Nguyễn Thị Thanh Thúy (VIE) Đào Lê Thu Trang (VIE)	2	1	1	2	30–33	—	WO
3	Maybelline Masuda (PHI) Annie Ramirez (PHI)	2	0	2	0			—

Pool B
Pos	Team	Pld	W	L	Pts	THA	TKM
1	Suphawadee Kaeosrasaen (THA) Kunsatri Kumsroi (THA)	1	1	0	2	—	35–28
2	Amina Halyllaýewa (TKM) Ruşana Nurjawowa (TKM)	1	0	1	0	28–35	—

Source: JJAU

===== Knockout round =====
Semifinals		Gold medal
Maryam (PAK); Sundus Salam Khan (PAK)	14
Amina Halyllaýewa (TKM); Ruşana Nurjawowa (TKM)	0	Maryam (PAK); Sundus Salam Khan (PAK)	33
Suphawadee Kaeosrasaen (THA); Kunsatri Kumsroi (THA)	14	Suphawadee Kaeosrasaen (THA); Kunsatri Kumsroi (THA)	36
Nguyễn Thị Thanh Thúy (VIE); Đào Lê Thu Trang (VIE)	0

==== Mixed ====
13 November

===== Preliminary round =====
Pool A
Pos	Team	Pld	W	L	Pts	PAK	VIE	TKM
1	Muhammad Ammar (PAK) Sundus Salam Khan (PAK)	2	2	0	4	—	34–31	33–28
2	Lê Tiến Thành (VIE) Đào Lê Thu Trang (VIE)	2	1	1	2	31–34	—	34–28
3	Ylýas Momunow (TKM) Ruşana Nurjawowa (TKM)	2	0	2	0	28–33	28–34	—

Pool B
Pos	Team	Pld	W	L	Pts	THA	INA	LIB
1	Ratcharat Yimprai (THA) Arreewan Chansri (THA)	2	2	0	4	—	38–34	WO
2	Eko Hendrawan Sofyan (INA) Lia Nurlianty Sofyan (INA)	2	1	1	2	34–38	—	WO
3	Damien Ziade (LIB) Caren Chammas (LIB)	2	0	2	0			—

Source: JJAU

===== Knockout round =====
Semifinals		Gold medal
Muhammad Ammar (PAK); Sundus Salam Khan (PAK)	36
Eko Hendrawan Sofyan (INA); Lia Nurlianty Sofyan (INA)	33	Muhammad Ammar (PAK); Sundus Salam Khan (PAK)	34
Ratcharat Yimprai (THA); Arreewan Chansri (THA)	WO	Ratcharat Yimprai (THA); Arreewan Chansri (THA)	39
Lê Tiến Thành (VIE); Đào Lê Thu Trang (VIE)

=== Men's ne-waza ===
==== 60 kg ====
12 November

1/8 finals
Ahmad Reza Eidi (IRI)	WO
Ylýas Momunow (TKM)
Farkhod Safolov (TJK)	0
Damien Ziade (LIB)	11
Saeed Anwar (PAK)	0
Phạm Minh Phú (VIE)	100
Saeed Al-Shamsi (UAE)	2
Abdulrahman Antar (YEM)	100
Naser Al-Faraj (KUW)	6
Mehran Sattar (IRI)	2
Sumiyaagiin Batgal (MGL)	100
Mohammed Hadi (IRQ)	0
Ahmed Al-Maazmi (UAE)	4
Huỳnh Nhất Thống (VIE)	0
Abu Hurraira Dhanani (PAK)	0
Sarawut Petsing (THA)	100

1/4 finals
Ahmad Reza Eidi (IRI)	8
Damien Ziade (LIB)	0
Phạm Minh Phú (VIE)	0
Abdulrahman Antar (YEM)	2
Naser Al-Faraj (KUW)	0
Sumiyaagiin Batgal (MGL)	12
Ahmed Al-Maazmi (UAE)	2
Sarawut Petsing (THA)	15

Semifinals
Ahmad Reza Eidi (IRI)	6
Abdulrahman Antar (YEM)	0
Sumiyaagiin Batgal (MGL)	9
Sarawut Petsing (THA)	0

Gold medal
Ahmad Reza Eidi (IRI)	0
Sumiyaagiin Batgal (MGL)	2

Final of repechage
Damien Ziade (LIB)	0
Phạm Minh Phú (VIE)	100
Naser Al-Faraj (KUW)	0
Ahmed Al-Maazmi (UAE)	7

Bronze medals
Phạm Minh Phú (VIE)	0
Sarawut Petsing (THA)	100
Ahmed Al-Maazmi (UAE)	2
Abdulrahman Antar (YEM)	0

==== 70 kg ====
12 November

1/8 finals
Ali Salem Al-Darai (UAE)	100
Sham Hussain (MDV)	0
Mahmoud Geragh (KUW)	100
Sulaymon Giyosov (TJK)	0
Amir Hossein Khademian (IRI)	11
Waheed-ud-Din (PAK)	0
Manavit Somboon (THA)	WO
Begli Meretgeldiýew (TKM)
Lê Tiến Thành (VIE)	11
Alijon Davlatov (TJK)	2
Javed Khan (PAK)	0
Ali Hassanpour (IRI)	100

1/4 finals
Ali Salem Al-Darai (UAE)	0
Mahmoud Geragh (KUW)	0
Amir Hossein Khademian (IRI)	100
Danh Út Kiên (VIE)	0
Manavit Somboon (THA)	4
Talib Al-Kirbi (UAE)	4
Lê Tiến Thành (VIE)	100
Ali Hassanpour (IRI)	0

Semifinals
Ali Salem Al-Darai (UAE)	0
Amir Hossein Khademian (IRI)	2
Talib Al-Kirbi (UAE)	100
Lê Tiến Thành (VIE)	0

Gold medal
Amir Hossein Khademian (IRI)	0
Talib Al-Kirbi (UAE)	100

Final of repechage
Mahmoud Geragh (KUW)	100
Danh Út Kiên (VIE)	0
Manavit Somboon (THA)	0
Ali Hassanpour (IRI)	0

Bronze medals
Mahmoud Geragh (KUW)	4
Lê Tiến Thành (VIE)	0
Manavit Somboon (THA)	0
Ali Salem Al-Darai (UAE)	4

==== 80 kg ====
12 November

1/8 finals
Farhan Anjum (PAK)	0
Murtadha Kamal (IRQ)	0
Mohammad Mansouri Davar (IRI)	100
Samwel Aýrapetýan (TKM)	0
Khalfan Balhol (UAE)	100
Ahmed Ayash (YEM)	0
Ali Sirousi (IRI)	0
Baasandorjiin Ariuntsog (MGL)	100

1/4 finals
Saoud Al-Hammadi (UAE)	2
John Baylon (PHI)	100
Farhan Anjum (PAK)	0
Mohammad Mansouri Davar (IRI)	100
Khalfan Balhol (UAE)	12
Sooknatee Suntra (THA)	4
Baasandorjiin Ariuntsog (MGL)	7
Abdullah Al-Faraj (KUW)	2

Semifinals
John Baylon (PHI)	0
Mohammad Mansouri Davar (IRI)	0
Khalfan Balhol (UAE)	8
Baasandorjiin Ariuntsog (MGL)	3

Gold medal
Mohammad Mansouri Davar (IRI)	3
Khalfan Balhol (UAE)	100

Final of repechage
Saoud Al-Hammadi (UAE)	100
Farhan Anjum (PAK)	0
Sooknatee Suntra (THA)	14
Abdullah Al-Faraj (KUW)	0

Bronze medals
Saoud Al-Hammadi (UAE)	4
Baasandorjiin Ariuntsog (MGL)	0
Sooknatee Suntra (THA)	4
John Baylon (PHI)	100

==== 90 kg ====
12 November

1/8 finals
Tô Hải Long (VIE)	0
Faisal Al-Ketbi (UAE)	15
Iraj Amirkhani (IRI)	24
Jawlanbek Madaminow (TKM)	0
Achilleus Ralli (THA)	0
Nacif Elias (LIB)	0

1/4 finals
Mohammad Ali (KUW)	0
Faisal Al-Ketbi (UAE)	0
Iraj Amirkhani (IRI)	8
Karamat Butt (PAK)	2
Mohammad Hossein Mansouri (IRI)	0
Odsürengiin Bold-Erdene (MGL)	100
Nacif Elias (LIB)	0
Zayed Al-Kaabi (UAE)	6

Semifinals
Faisal Al-Ketbi (UAE)	4
Iraj Amirkhani (IRI)	0
Odsürengiin Bold-Erdene (MGL)	4
Zayed Al-Kaabi (UAE)	4

Gold medal
Faisal Al-Ketbi (UAE)	100
Zayed Al-Kaabi (UAE)	0

Final of repechage
Mohammad Ali (KUW)	100
Karamat Butt (PAK)	0
Mohammad Hossein Mansouri (IRI)	0
Nacif Elias (LIB)	100

Bronze medals
Mohammad Ali (KUW)	0
Odsürengiin Bold-Erdene (MGL)	2
Nacif Elias (LIB)	0
Iraj Amirkhani (IRI)	0

==== +90 kg ====
12 November

1/8 finals
Mohamed Al-Nuaimi (UAE)	5
Ali Asghar Dokouhaki (IRI)	100
Chakrit Chidsin (THA)	100
Yahya Mohammed (IRQ)	0
Ahmed Butt (PAK)	2
Kuwwat Nuryýew (TKM)	0

1/4 finals
Ali Asghar Dokouhaki (IRI)	0
Abdullah Al-Mulla (KUW)	100
Natdanai Netthip (THA)	100
Nguyễn Anh Tùng (VIE)	0
Chakrit Chidsin (THA)	5
Eid Al-Teneiji (UAE)	2
Lý Huỳnh Long (VIE)	0
Ahmed Butt (PAK)	3

Semifinals
Abdullah Al-Mulla (KUW)	8
Natdanai Netthip (THA)	10
Chakrit Chidsin (THA)	0
Ahmed Butt (PAK)	7

Gold medal
Natdanai Netthip (THA)	2
Ahmed Butt (PAK)	9

Final of repechage
Ali Asghar Dokouhaki (IRI)	100
Nguyễn Anh Tùng (VIE)	0
Eid Al-Teneiji (UAE)	2
Lý Huỳnh Long (VIE)	0

Bronze medals
Ali Asghar Dokouhaki (IRI)	2
Chakrit Chidsin (THA)	2
Eid Al-Teneiji (UAE)	0
Abdullah Al-Mulla (KUW)	10

==== Openweight ====
13 November

1/8 finals
Mohammad Ali (KUW)	100
Yahya Mohammed (IRQ)	0
Baasandorjiin Ariuntsog (MGL)	2
Khalfan Balhol (UAE)	2
Odsürengiin Bold-Erdene (MGL)	0
Iraj Amirkhani (IRI)	0

1/4 finals
Mohammad Ali (KUW)	0
Khalfan Balhol (UAE)	5
Ahmed Butt (PAK)	4
Ali Asghar Dokouhaki (IRI)	2
Faisal Al-Ketbi (UAE)	100
Chakrit Chidsin (THA)	0
Iraj Amirkhani (IRI)	0
Nacif Elias (LIB)	2

Semifinals
Khalfan Balhol (UAE)	6
Ahmed Butt (PAK)	0
Faisal Al-Ketbi (UAE)	0
Nacif Elias (LIB)	0

Gold medal
Khalfan Balhol (UAE)	0
Faisal Al-Ketbi (UAE)	100

Final of repechage
Mohammad Ali (KUW)	100
Ali Asghar Dokouhaki (IRI)	0
Chakrit Chidsin (THA)	0
Iraj Amirkhani (IRI)	100

Bronze medals
Mohammad Ali (KUW)	WO
Nacif Elias (LIB)
Iraj Amirkhani (IRI)	100
Ahmed Butt (PAK)	0

=== Women's ne-waza ===
==== 50 kg ====
13 November

1/4 finals		Semifinals		Gold medal
Humaira Ashiq (PAK)	0
Tatchapan Srisamer (THA)	100	Tatchapan Srisamer (THA)	8
Maybelline Masuda (PHI)	100	Maybelline Masuda (PHI)	18
Hà Anh Thự (VIE)	0			Maybelline Masuda (PHI)	15
Amina Halyllaýewa (TKM)	100			Đào Lê Thu Trang (VIE)	0
Maryam (PAK)	0	Amina Halyllaýewa (TKM)	0
		Đào Lê Thu Trang (VIE)	100

Final of repechage
Humaira Ashiq (PAK)	0
Hà Anh Thự (VIE)	100

Bronze medals
Hà Anh Thự (VIE)	100
Amina Halyllaýewa (TKM)	0
Maryam (PAK)
Tatchapan Srisamer (THA)	WO

==== 60 kg ====
13 November

1/4 finals		Semifinals		Gold medal
Nargis Nozirova (TJK)	0
Ambreen Masih (PAK)	2	Ambreen Masih (PAK)	0
Onanong Saengsirichok (THA)	4	Onanong Saengsirichok (THA)	100
Nguyễn Thị Thanh Thúy (VIE)	0			Onanong Saengsirichok (THA)	0
Dorligiin Dolgor (MGL)	0			Annie Ramirez (PHI)	100
Ruşana Nurjawowa (TKM)	100	Ruşana Nurjawowa (TKM)	0
Annie Ramirez (PHI)	100	Annie Ramirez (PHI)	12
Nguyễn Thị Quỳnh (VIE)	2

Final of repechage
Nargis Nozirova (TJK)	0
Nguyễn Thị Thanh Thúy (VIE)	100
Dorligiin Dolgor (MGL)	0
Nguyễn Thị Quỳnh (VIE)	100

Bronze medals
Nguyễn Thị Thanh Thúy (VIE)	100
Ruşana Nurjawowa (TKM)	0
Nguyễn Thị Quỳnh (VIE)	100
Ambreen Masih (PAK)	0

==== +60 kg ====
13 November

1/4 finals		Semifinals		Gold medal
Nguyễn Thị Hương (VIE)	4
Beenish Khan (PAK)	4	Nguyễn Thị Hương (VIE)	13
Shafaa Hassan (UAE)	100	Shafaa Hassan (UAE)	4
Nursoltan Aşyrowa (TKM)	0			Nguyễn Thị Hương (VIE)	0
Nguyễn Thị Lan (VIE)	0			Battsogtyn Buyandelger (MGL)	13
Wassanaporn Samthong (THA)	2	Wassanaporn Samthong (THA)	2
Battsogtyn Buyandelger (MGL)	WO	Battsogtyn Buyandelger (MGL)	100
Caren Chammas (LIB)

Final of repechage
Beenish Khan (PAK)	100
Nursoltan Aşyrowa (TKM)	0
Nguyễn Thị Lan (VIE)	WO
Caren Chammas (LIB)

Bronze medals
Beenish Khan (PAK)	0
Wassanaporn Samthong (THA)	100
Nguyễn Thị Lan (VIE)	100
Shafaa Hassan (UAE)	0
