= Beach kurash at the 2014 Asian Beach Games =

- Venue: Patong Beach
- Dates: 15–17 November 2014

Kurash competition at the 2014 Asian Beach Games was held in Phuket, Thailand from 15 to 17 November 2014 at Patong Beach, Phuket.

== Medalists ==
=== Men ===
Event	Gold	Silver	Bronze
−66 kg	Ghanbar Ali Ghanbari; Iran	Chan Hao-cheng; Chinese Taipei	Songwutt Kaewpinit; Thailand
−66 kg	Ghanbar Ali Ghanbari; Iran	Chan Hao-cheng; Chinese Taipei	Muhammet Artykow; Turkmenistan
−73 kg	Davlat Abraev; Uzbekistan	Hadi Ghadimi; Iran	Takeru Nobeashi; Japan
−73 kg	Davlat Abraev; Uzbekistan	Hadi Ghadimi; Iran	Chuang Shang-chin; Chinese Taipei
−81 kg	None awarded	Ahmed Ayash; Yemen	Methkal Al-Jaramani; Syria
−81 kg	None awarded	Ahmed Ayash; Yemen	Elias Aliakbari; Iran
−90 kg	Nacif Elias; Lebanon	Ali Dehghanifard; Iran	Abdulshakoor Abdulghafoor; Afghanistan
−90 kg	Nacif Elias; Lebanon	Ali Dehghanifard; Iran	Saidzhalol Saidov; Tajikistan
+90 kg	Mukhamadmurod Abdurakhmonov; Tajikistan	Ekramuddin Ahmadi; Afghanistan	Hamid Gholi; Iran
+90 kg	Mukhamadmurod Abdurakhmonov; Tajikistan	Ekramuddin Ahmadi; Afghanistan	Altangereliin Davaanyam; Mongolia

=== Women ===
Event	Gold	Silver	Bronze
−52 kg	Văn Ngọc Tú; Vietnam	Chen Chin-ying; Chinese Taipei	Aýna Jumakulyýewa; Turkmenistan
−52 kg	Văn Ngọc Tú; Vietnam	Chen Chin-ying; Chinese Taipei	Siramol Deepudsa; Thailand
−57 kg	Lee Wan-ting; Chinese Taipei	Petlada Nuinkaew; Thailand	Zarina Abdyrahmanowa; Turkmenistan
−57 kg	Lee Wan-ting; Chinese Taipei	Petlada Nuinkaew; Thailand	Lê Thị Tình; Vietnam
−63 kg	Orapa Senatham; Thailand	Caren Chammas; Lebanon	Nguyễn Thị Hương; Vietnam
−63 kg	Orapa Senatham; Thailand	Caren Chammas; Lebanon	Gitanjali Pawar; India

== Medal table ==
Rank	Nation	Gold	Silver	Bronze	Total
1	Iran (IRI)	1	2	2	5
2	Chinese Taipei (TPE)	1	2	1	4
3	Thailand (THA)	1	1	2	4
4	Lebanon (LIB)	1	1	0	2
5	Vietnam (VIE)	1	0	2	3
6	Tajikistan (TJK)	1	0	1	2
7	Uzbekistan (UZB)	1	0	0	1
8	Afghanistan (AFG)	0	1	1	2
9	Yemen (YEM)	0	1	0	1
10	Turkmenistan (TKM)	0	0	3	3
11	India (IND)	0	0	1	1
11	Japan (JPN)	0	0	1	1
11	Mongolia (MGL)	0	0	1	1
11	Syria (SYR)	0	0	1	1
Totals (14 entries)		7	8	16	31

== Results ==
=== Men ===
==== 66 kg ====
15 November

1/8 finals
Chan Hao-cheng (TPE)	1
Damien Ziade (LIB)	0
Nguyễn Trọng Cường (VIE)	0
Songwutt Kaewpinit (THA)	1
Baasantserengiin Erdenelkhagva (MGL)	0
Muhammet Artykow (TKM)	1
Nilesh Balhara (IND)	0
Ghanbar Ali Ghanbari (IRI)	1
Kota Horaguchi (JPN)	1
Bakhodur Khalimov (TJK)	2

1/4 finals
Waris Ali (PAK)	2
Chan Hao-cheng (TPE)	3
Abdulrahman Antar (YEM)	1
Songwutt Kaewpinit (THA)	2
Uktam Ergashev (UZB)	0
Muhammet Artykow (TKM)	1
Ghanbar Ali Ghanbari (IRI)	4
Bakhodur Khalimov (TJK)	2

Semifinals
Chan Hao-cheng (TPE)	1
Songwutt Kaewpinit (THA)	0
Muhammet Artykow (TKM)	1
Ghanbar Ali Ghanbari (IRI)	2

Gold medal
Chan Hao-cheng (TPE)	1
Ghanbar Ali Ghanbari (IRI)	4

==== 73 kg ====
16 November

1/8 finals
Nurýagdy Jepbarow (TKM)	4
Banpot Lertthaisong (THA)	1

1/4 finals
Trần Văn Chương (VIE)	1
Hadi Ghadimi (IRI)	3
Takeru Nobeashi (JPN)	1
Manish Tokas (IND)	0
Davlat Abraev (UZB)	1
Jasim Qaddoori (IRQ)	0
Chuang Shang-chin (TPE)	2
Nurýagdy Jepbarow (TKM)	1

Semifinals
Hadi Ghadimi (IRI)	1
Takeru Nobeashi (JPN)	0
Davlat Abraev (UZB)	1
Chuang Shang-chin (TPE)	0

Gold medal
Hadi Ghadimi (IRI)	0
Davlat Abraev (UZB)	1

==== 81 kg ====
16 November

1/8 finals
Sanjar Tukhtashov (UZB)	4
Serdar Jummyýew (TKM)	1

1/4 finals
Daichi Kusano (JPN)	3
Ahmed Ayash (YEM)	6
Methkal Al-Jaramani (SYR)	WO
Safarbek Murodov (TJK)
Elyas Aminyar (AFG)	0
Elias Aliakbari (IRI)	1
Georges Merheb (LIB)	1
Sanjar Tukhtashov (UZB)	2

Semifinals
Ahmed Ayash (YEM)	1
Methkal Al-Jaramani (SYR)	0
Elias Aliakbari (IRI)	2
Sanjar Tukhtashov (UZB)	3

Gold medal
Ahmed Ayash (YEM)	1
Sanjar Tukhtashov (UZB)	2

- Sanjar Tukhtashov of Uzbekistan originally won the gold medal, but was disqualified after he tested positive for 19-Norandrosterone.

==== 90 kg ====
17 November

1/4 finals		Semifinals		Gold medal
		Ali Dehghanifard (IRI)	3
Abdulshakoor Abdulghafoor (AFG)	3	Abdulshakoor Abdulghafoor (AFG)	1
Manish Kumar (IND)	2			Ali Dehghanifard (IRI)	2
Adnan Khankan (SYR)	1			Nacif Elias (LIB)	4
Nacif Elias (LIB)	2	Nacif Elias (LIB)	1
		Saidzhalol Saidov (TJK)	0

==== +90 kg ====
17 November

1/4 finals		Semifinals		Gold medal
		Ekramuddin Ahmadi (AFG)	RET
		Hamid Gholi (IRI)
				Ekramuddin Ahmadi (AFG)	0
Mukhamadmurod Abdurakhmonov (TJK)	1			Mukhamadmurod Abdurakhmonov (TJK)	1
Pierre Bou Abboud (LIB)	0	Mukhamadmurod Abdurakhmonov (TJK)	1
		Altangereliin Davaanyam (MGL)	0

=== Women ===
==== 52 kg ====
15 November

Semifinals		Gold medal
Aýna Jumakulyýewa (TKM)	1
Chen Chin-ying (TPE)	2	Chen Chin-ying (TPE)	0
Văn Ngọc Tú (VIE)	1	Văn Ngọc Tú (VIE)	1
Siramol Deepudsa (THA)	0

==== 57 kg ====
16 November

1/4 finals		Semifinals		Gold medal
		Zarina Abdyrahmanowa (TKM)	0
Megha Tokas (IND)	2	Lee Wan-ting (TPE)	1
Lee Wan-ting (TPE)	3			Lee Wan-ting (TPE)	3
				Petlada Nuinkaew (THA)	1
		Lê Thị Tình (VIE)	0
		Petlada Nuinkaew (THA)	1

==== 63 kg ====
17 November

1/4 finals		Semifinals		Gold medal
		Bye
Nguyễn Thị Hương (VIE)	0	Orapa Senatham (THA)
Orapa Senatham (THA)	1			Orapa Senatham (THA)	2
				Caren Chammas (LIB)	0
		Caren Chammas (LIB)	1
		Gitanjali Pawar (IND)	0
