= Beach sambo at the 2014 Asian Beach Games =

Sambo competitions

- Venue: Karon Beach
- Dates: 12–13 November 2014

Sambo competition at the 2014 Asian Beach Games was held in Phuket, Thailand from 12 to 13 November 2014 at Karon Beach, Phuket.

Beach Sambo fights were held only in the standing position in three minutes. Victory was awarded after a throw when the opponent as a result of conducting active action falls on the sand on any part of the body other than the feet.

== Medalists ==
Event	Gold	Silver	Bronze
Men's 68 kg	Davaadorjiin Tömörkhüleg; Mongolia	Artur Te; Kyrgyzstan	Jung Min-suk; South Korea
Men's 68 kg	Davaadorjiin Tömörkhüleg; Mongolia	Artur Te; Kyrgyzstan	Bagdat Zharylgassov; Kazakhstan
Men's 82 kg	Gany Tüvshinjargal; Mongolia	Yerzhan Kabdelov; Kazakhstan	Tejen Tejenow; Turkmenistan
Men's 82 kg	Gany Tüvshinjargal; Mongolia	Yerzhan Kabdelov; Kazakhstan	Yousef Karimian; Iran
Men's 100 kg	Choi Cheon; South Korea	Ehsan Karimian; Iran	Eldor Gulyamov; Uzbekistan
Men's 100 kg	Choi Cheon; South Korea	Ehsan Karimian; Iran	Alaa Issa; Iraq
Women's 52 kg	Gülbadam Babamuratowa; Turkmenistan	Leila Konuspayeva; Kazakhstan	Bhagawati Majhi; Nepal
Women's 52 kg	Gülbadam Babamuratowa; Turkmenistan	Leila Konuspayeva; Kazakhstan	Shahlo Yuldasheva; Uzbekistan
Women's 64 kg	Tümen-Odyn Battögs; Mongolia	Caren Chammas; Lebanon	Nadia Assaf; Syria
Women's 64 kg	Tümen-Odyn Battögs; Mongolia	Caren Chammas; Lebanon	Shokhista Safarova; Uzbekistan
Women's 72 kg	Bataagiin Sainbuyan; Mongolia	Nasiba Surkiýewa; Turkmenistan	Supattra Nanong; Thailand
Women's 72 kg	Bataagiin Sainbuyan; Mongolia	Nasiba Surkiýewa; Turkmenistan	Viktoriya Ozdaeva; Uzbekistan
Mixed team	Kazakhstan; Bagdat Zharylgassov; Yerzhan Kabdelov; Chingis Shokputov; Leila Konuspayeva; Farida Dossymbekova; Zere Bektaskyzy	Turkmenistan; Niýazmyrat Şahmyradow; Tejen Tejenow; Nuraly Ýalkapow; Gülbadam Babamuratowa; Zuhra Madraimowa; Nasiba Surkiýewa	Mongolia; Davaadorjiin Tömörkhüleg; Gany Tüvshinjargal; Batbayaryn Ariun-Erdene; Sampilyn Solongogerel; Tümen-Odyn Battögs; Bataagiin Sainbuyan
Mixed team	Kazakhstan; Bagdat Zharylgassov; Yerzhan Kabdelov; Chingis Shokputov; Leila Konuspayeva; Farida Dossymbekova; Zere Bektaskyzy	Turkmenistan; Niýazmyrat Şahmyradow; Tejen Tejenow; Nuraly Ýalkapow; Gülbadam Babamuratowa; Zuhra Madraimowa; Nasiba Surkiýewa	Uzbekistan; Sherbek Ruziev; Farrukh Jumaev; Eldor Gulyamov; Shahlo Yuldasheva; Shokhista Safarova; Viktoriya Ozdaeva

== Medal table ==
Rank	Nation	Gold	Silver	Bronze	Total
1	Mongolia (MGL)	4	0	1	5
2	Kazakhstan (KAZ)	1	2	1	4
2	Turkmenistan (TKM)	1	2	1	4
4	South Korea (KOR)	1	0	1	2
5	Iran (IRI)	0	1	1	2
6	Kyrgyzstan (KGZ)	0	1	0	1
6	Lebanon (LIB)	0	1	0	1
8	Uzbekistan (UZB)	0	0	5	5
9	Iraq (IRQ)	0	0	1	1
9	Nepal (NEP)	0	0	1	1
9	Syria (SYR)	0	0	1	1
9	Thailand (THA)	0	0	1	1
Totals (12 entries)		7	7	14	28

== Results ==
=== Men's 68 kg ===
12 November

1/8 finals
Artur Te (KGZ)	TH
Vahid Hassanzadeh (IRI)
Jung Min-suk (KOR)	TH
Gopal Pun Magar (NEP)
Niýazmyrat Şahmyradow (TKM)	TH
Pongthep Tumrongluk (THA)
Bagdat Zharylgassov (KAZ)	TH
Sufyan Nadhim (IRQ)

Quarterfinals
Artur Te (KGZ)	TH
Mustafo Khasanov (TJK)
Jung Min-suk (KOR)	TH
Sherbek Ruziev (UZB)
Niýazmyrat Şahmyradow (TKM)
Davaadorjiin Tömörkhüleg (MGL)	TH
Bagdat Zharylgassov (KAZ)	TH
Daiki Hashimoto (JPN)

Semifinals
Artur Te (KGZ)	TH
Jung Min-suk (KOR)
Davaadorjiin Tömörkhüleg (MGL)	TH
Bagdat Zharylgassov (KAZ)

Final
Artur Te (KGZ)
Davaadorjiin Tömörkhüleg (MGL)	TH

=== Men's 82 kg ===
12 November

1/8 finals
Sameh Ramadan (SYR)
Shinya Terui (JPN)	TH
Gany Tüvshinjargal (MGL)	TH
Azamkhon Zaynalobuddini (TJK)
Yerzhan Kabdelov (KAZ)	TH
Sonram Jenghor (THA)
Zhamalbek Asylbek Uulu (KGZ)
Yousef Karimian (IRI)	TH

Quarterfinals
Shinya Terui (JPN)
Tejen Tejenow (TKM)	TH
Gany Tüvshinjargal (MGL)	TH
Zabihullah Obaidullah (AFG)
Yerzhan Kabdelov (KAZ)	TH
Georges Merheb (LIB)
Yousef Karimian (IRI)	TH
Farrukh Jumaev (UZB)

Semifinals
Tejen Tejenow (TKM)
Gany Tüvshinjargal (MGL)	TH
Yerzhan Kabdelov (KAZ)	TH
Yousef Karimian (IRI)

Final
Gany Tüvshinjargal (MGL)	TH
Yerzhan Kabdelov (KAZ)

=== Men's 100 kg ===
12 November

1/8 finals
Pierre Bou Abboud (LIB)
Sitthipong Niemkunchon (THA)	TH
Katana Nishimura (JPN)
Choi Cheon (KOR)	TH
Alaa Issa (IRQ)	TH
Saimullah Mahdawi (AFG)
Ehsan Karimian (IRI)	TH
Nuraly Ýalkapow (TKM)

Quarterfinals
Sitthipong Niemkunchon (THA)
Eldor Gulyamov (UZB)	TH
Choi Cheon (KOR)	TH
Ilgiz Kanalbek Uulu (KGZ)
Alaa Issa (IRQ)	TH
Chingis Shokputov (KAZ)
Ehsan Karimian (IRI)	0
Batbayaryn Ariun-Erdene (MGL)	0

Semifinals
Eldor Gulyamov (UZB)
Choi Cheon (KOR)	TH
Alaa Issa (IRQ)
Ehsan Karimian (IRI)	TH

Final
Choi Cheon (KOR)	0
Ehsan Karimian (IRI)	0

=== Women's 52 kg ===
12 November

Quarterfinals
Gülbadam Babamuratowa (TKM)	0
Sampilyn Solongogerel (MGL)	0
Leila Konuspayeva (KAZ)	TH
Amornrat Butrat (THA)

Semifinals
Gülbadam Babamuratowa (TKM)	TH
Bhagawati Majhi (NEP)
Leila Konuspayeva (KAZ)	TH
Shahlo Yuldasheva (UZB)

Final
Gülbadam Babamuratowa (TKM)	TH
Leila Konuspayeva (KAZ)

=== Women's 64 kg ===
12 November

Quarterfinals
Caren Chammas (LIB)	TH
Sung Ji-eun (KOR)
Onouma Ponlamad (THA)
Nadia Assaf (SYR)	TH
Farida Dossymbekova (KAZ)
Shokhista Safarova (UZB)	TH
Tümen-Odyn Battögs (MGL)	TH
Zuhra Madraimowa (TKM)

Semifinals
Caren Chammas (LIB)	TH
Nadia Assaf (SYR)
Shokhista Safarova (UZB)
Tümen-Odyn Battögs (MGL)	TH

Final
Caren Chammas (LIB)
Tümen-Odyn Battögs (MGL)	TH

=== Women's 72 kg ===
12 November

Quarterfinals
Chi Soo-hee (KOR)
Supattra Nanong (THA)	TH
Nasiba Surkiýewa (TKM)	TH
Zere Bektaskyzy (KAZ)

Semifinals
Supattra Nanong (THA)
Bataagiin Sainbuyan (MGL)	TH
Nasiba Surkiýewa (TKM)	TH
Viktoriya Ozdaeva (UZB)

Final
Bataagiin Sainbuyan (MGL)	TH
Nasiba Surkiýewa (TKM)

=== Mixed team ===
13 November

1/8 finals
Thailand	WO
Afghanistan
Turkmenistan	WO
Tajikistan
Japan	WO
Syria
South Korea	0
Mongolia	3
Kazakhstan	WO
Iraq
Lebanon
Kyrgyzstan	WO
Uzbekistan	WO
Nepal

Quarterfinals
Thailand	0
Turkmenistan	5
Japan	0
Mongolia	5
Kazakhstan	4
Kyrgyzstan	1
Uzbekistan	5
Iran	0

Semifinals
Turkmenistan	3
Mongolia	2
Kazakhstan	4
Uzbekistan	1

Final
Turkmenistan	2
Kazakhstan	3
