= Ahmed Ayash =

Yemeni judoka (born 1994)

Ahmed Ayash (born 1 January 1994) is a Yemeni judoka who competes in the under 73 kg category.

He has represented Yemen in kurash, and ju-jitsu as well as judo, in which he was selected to compete at the delayed 2020 Summer Games in Tokyo, where he was drawn in his first match against Akil Gjakova.

== Competitions ==
=== Judo ===
- Judo at the 2020 Summer Olympics – Men's 73 kg
- 2019 World Judo Championships – Men's 73 kg
- 2018 World Judo Championships – Men's 73 kg
- Judo at the 2018 Asian Games – Men's 73 kg

=== Ju-jitsu ===
- Ju-jitsu at the 2018 Asian Games – Men's 77 kg
- Ju-jitsu at the 2014 Asian Beach Games (80 kg)

=== Kurash ===
- Kurash at the 2017 Asian Indoor and Martial Arts Games (73 kg)
- Beach kurash at the 2014 Asian Beach Games (81 kg)
