= Beach sepak takraw at the 2014 Asian Beach Games =

- Venue: Patong Beach
- Dates: 16–23 November 2014

Beach sepak takraw competition at the 2014 Asian Beach Games was held in Phuket, Thailand from 16 to 23 November 2014 at Patong Beach.

== Medalists ==
Event	Gold	Silver	Bronze
Men's trios	Brunei; Ismail Ang; Hafizuddin Jamaluddin; Nur Alimin Sungoh; Mohd Shukri Jaineh; Jamaluddin Hj Marzi	South Korea; Park Hyeon-geun; Ma Kwang-hee; Han Sung-ki; Kim Jung-man; Im An-soo	Laos; Vanhkham Sonmani; Daovy Sanavongxay; Noum Souvannalith; Viengnakhone Kitmaly; Yothin Sombatphouthone
Men's trios	Brunei; Ismail Ang; Hafizuddin Jamaluddin; Nur Alimin Sungoh; Mohd Shukri Jaineh; Jamaluddin Hj Marzi	South Korea; Park Hyeon-geun; Ma Kwang-hee; Han Sung-ki; Kim Jung-man; Im An-soo	Myanmar; Ko Khaing Min; Naing Aung Myo; Zin Ko Ko; Zaw Min Tun
Men's regu	Thailand; Uthen Kukheaw; Aphisak Sarachon; Phakpong Dejaroen; Sornpithak Sriring; Seksan Tubtong; Jackrit Wijara	Indonesia; Nofrizal; Syamsul Akmal; Hendra Pago; Muhammad Ruswan Wajib; Victoria Eka Prasetyo; Firmansyah	Iran; Hassan Alizadeh; Amir Khani; Vahid Ebrahimi; Mohammad Safaei Majd; Vahid Maleki; Abdolnaser Pangh
Men's regu	Thailand; Uthen Kukheaw; Aphisak Sarachon; Phakpong Dejaroen; Sornpithak Sriring; Seksan Tubtong; Jackrit Wijara	Indonesia; Nofrizal; Syamsul Akmal; Hendra Pago; Muhammad Ruswan Wajib; Victoria Eka Prasetyo; Firmansyah	Laos; Vanhkham Sonmani; Daovy Sanavongxay; Noum Souvannalith; Viengnakhone Kitmaly; Yothin Sombatphouthone
Men's team regu	Thailand; Komkid Suapimpa; Uthen Kukheaw; Aphisak Sarachon; Phakpong Dejaroen; Thinnagon Phanted; Phirathep Pantaeng; Akkasit Hanpatub; Sornpithak Sriring; Wannimit Promdee; Seksan Tubtong; Jackrit Wijara; Purich Pansira	South Korea; Park Hyeon-geun; Ma Kwang-hee; Han Sung-ki; Kim Jung-seung; Kim Dong-uk; Kim Jung-man; Im An-soo; Jeong Won-deok	Iran; Hassan Alizadeh; Amir Khani; Vahid Ebrahimi; Saman Jahantigh; Mohammad Safaei Majd; Vahid Maleki; Ali Azizabadi; Saeid Asiaban; Mehrdad Jafari; Pedram Khodadadeh; Abdolnaser Pangh; Omid Hassani
Men's team regu	Thailand; Komkid Suapimpa; Uthen Kukheaw; Aphisak Sarachon; Phakpong Dejaroen; Thinnagon Phanted; Phirathep Pantaeng; Akkasit Hanpatub; Sornpithak Sriring; Wannimit Promdee; Seksan Tubtong; Jackrit Wijara; Purich Pansira	South Korea; Park Hyeon-geun; Ma Kwang-hee; Han Sung-ki; Kim Jung-seung; Kim Dong-uk; Kim Jung-man; Im An-soo; Jeong Won-deok	India; Rajen Singh Kongham; Sandeep Raghav; Arjun Siva Prasad; Ismail Shaik; Sandeep Kumar; Harish Kumar; Viseyie Koso; Kheta Ram; Ganesh Rajasekar; Malemnganba Sorokhaibam; Lalit Kumar
Women's trios	Laos; Philavanh Chanthsily; Damdouane Lattanavongsa; Nouandam Volabouth; Chiep Banxavang; Norkham Vongxay	Myanmar; Naing Naing Win; Kyaw Hsu Mon; Nan Su Myat San; Than Aye Aye	South Korea; Park Keum-duk; Ahn Soon-ok; Jeong In-seon; Kim Hee-jin; Kim Ji-young
Women's trios	Laos; Philavanh Chanthsily; Damdouane Lattanavongsa; Nouandam Volabouth; Chiep Banxavang; Norkham Vongxay	Myanmar; Naing Naing Win; Kyaw Hsu Mon; Nan Su Myat San; Than Aye Aye	India; Annam Tharangini; Leelavathy Thathireddy; Sameena Begum; Namita Sinha; Meena Kumari
Women's regu	Thailand; Thiwaphon Nueangchamnong; Nisa Thanaattawut; Somruedee Pruepruk; Thidarat Soda; Jariya Seesawad; Piyapan Tungjai	Vietnam; Trần Thị Thu Hằng; Trần Hồng Nhung; Đỗ Thị Nguyên; Nguyễn Thái Linh; Trần Thị Việt Mỹ; Phạm Thị Nguyệt	Laos; Philavanh Chanthsily; Damdouane Lattanavongsa; Nouandam Volabouth; Chiep Banxavang; Norkham Vongxay
Women's regu	Thailand; Thiwaphon Nueangchamnong; Nisa Thanaattawut; Somruedee Pruepruk; Thidarat Soda; Jariya Seesawad; Piyapan Tungjai	Vietnam; Trần Thị Thu Hằng; Trần Hồng Nhung; Đỗ Thị Nguyên; Nguyễn Thái Linh; Trần Thị Việt Mỹ; Phạm Thị Nguyệt	Indonesia; Dini Mita Sari; Akyko Micheel Kapito; Widya Andrini Modjundju; Nur Isni Chikita Sumito; Kusnelia; Irma Wati
Women's team regu	Thailand; Apinya Thongpoo; Thiwaphon Nueangchamnong; Sirinapa Pornnongsan; Nisa Thanaattawut; Nongnuch Inruengsorn; Somruedee Pruepruk; Jiranan Bunvisas; Thidarat Soda; Siriphol Chaiyasit; Orathai Buasri; Jariya Seesawad; Piyapan Tungjai	Vietnam; Trần Thị Thu Hằng; Trần Hồng Nhung; Nguyễn Thị Mỹ; Phạm Thị Lan; Vũ Thùy Linh; Đỗ Thị Nguyên; Lưu Thị Kim Thúy; Nguyễn Thái Linh; Trần Thị Việt Mỹ; Phạm Thị Nguyệt	South Korea; Park Keum-duk; Ahn Soon-ok; Jeong In-seon; Kim Hee-jin; Kim Ji-young; Jeong Hyeon-jeong; Jeong Yu-jeong; Lee Ji-eun
Women's team regu	Thailand; Apinya Thongpoo; Thiwaphon Nueangchamnong; Sirinapa Pornnongsan; Nisa Thanaattawut; Nongnuch Inruengsorn; Somruedee Pruepruk; Jiranan Bunvisas; Thidarat Soda; Siriphol Chaiyasit; Orathai Buasri; Jariya Seesawad; Piyapan Tungjai	Vietnam; Trần Thị Thu Hằng; Trần Hồng Nhung; Nguyễn Thị Mỹ; Phạm Thị Lan; Vũ Thùy Linh; Đỗ Thị Nguyên; Lưu Thị Kim Thúy; Nguyễn Thái Linh; Trần Thị Việt Mỹ; Phạm Thị Nguyệt	China; Shao Yang; Zhai Heyang; Li Shengnan; Hu Cuiyun; Du Xuerui; Qin Tong; Wang Qiyue; Cui Yongyan; Long Yihan

== Medal table ==
Rank	Nation	Gold	Silver	Bronze	Total
1	Thailand (THA)	4	0	0	4
2	Laos (LAO)	1	0	3	4
3	Brunei (BRU)	1	0	0	1
4	South Korea (KOR)	0	2	2	4
5	Vietnam (VIE)	0	2	0	2
6	Indonesia (INA)	0	1	1	2
6	Myanmar (MYA)	0	1	1	2
8	India (IND)	0	0	2	2
8	Iran (IRI)	0	0	2	2
10	China (CHN)	0	0	1	1
Totals (10 entries)		6	6	12	24

== Results ==
=== Men's trios ===
==== Preliminary round ====
===== Group A =====
Pos	Team	Pld	W	L	SF	SA	SD	Pts
1	Laos	2	2	0	4	0	+4	4
2	Myanmar	2	1	1	2	3	−1	2
3	Indonesia	2	0	2	1	4	−3	0

Source: OCA

Date		Score		Set 1	Set 2	Set 3
19 Nov	Laos	2–0	Indonesia	21–19	21–13	
19 Nov	Indonesia	1–2	Myanmar	17–21	21–12	15–21
20 Nov	Laos	2–0	Myanmar	21–19	24–22	

===== Group B =====
Pos	Team	Pld	W	L	SF	SA	SD	Pts
1	Brunei	3	3	0	6	0	+6	6
2	South Korea	3	2	1	4	2	+2	4
3	India	3	1	2	2	4	−2	2
4	China	3	0	3	0	6	−6	0

Source: OCA

Date		Score		Set 1	Set 2	Set 3
19 Nov	Brunei	2–0	China	21–9	21–13	
19 Nov	India	0–2	South Korea	8–21	15–21	
19 Nov	Brunei	2–0	India	21–15	21–15	
19 Nov	China	0–2	South Korea	9–21	22–24	
20 Nov	Brunei	2–0	South Korea	21–15	21–17	
20 Nov	China	0–2	India	16–21	18–21	

==== Knockout round ====
Semifinals; 20 November				Final; 21 November
Laos	18	21	17
South Korea	21	10	21	South Korea	18	23	15
Brunei	17	21	21	Brunei	21	21	21
Myanmar	21	16	13

=== Men's regu ===
==== Preliminary round ====
===== Group A =====
Pos	Team	Pld	W	L	SF	SA	SD	Pts
1	Thailand	2	2	0	4	0	+4	4
2	Iran	2	1	1	2	3	−1	2
3	Brunei	2	0	2	1	4	−3	0

Source: OCA

Date		Score		Set 1	Set 2	Set 3
21 Nov	Iran	0–2	Thailand	8–21	3–21	
21 Nov	Iran	2–1	Brunei	21–19	7–21	21–15
22 Nov	Brunei	0–2	Thailand	13–21	11–21	

===== Group B =====
Pos	Team	Pld	W	L	SF	SA	SD	Pts
1	Indonesia	3	2	1	5	3	+2	4
2	Laos	3	2	1	5	3	+2	4
3	Myanmar	3	2	1	5	3	+2	4
4	China	3	0	3	0	6	−6	0

Source: OCA

Date		Score		Set 1	Set 2	Set 3
21 Nov	Myanmar	1–2	Laos	22–20	19–21	13–21
21 Nov	Indonesia	2–0	China	21–16	21–14	
21 Nov	Myanmar	2–1	Indonesia	21–18	18–21	24–22
21 Nov	Laos	2–0	China	21–15	21–15	
22 Nov	Myanmar	2–0	China	24–22	21–7	
22 Nov	Laos	1–2	Indonesia	21–13	14–21	14–21

==== Knockout round ====
Semifinals; 22 November			Final; 23 November
Indonesia	22	21
Iran	20	12	Indonesia	8	16
Thailand	21	21	Thailand	21	21
Laos	12	9

=== Men's team regu ===
Pos	Team	Pld	W	L	MF	MA	MD	Pts
1	Thailand	3	3	0	6	0	+6	6
2	South Korea	3	2	1	4	3	+1	4
3	Iran	3	1	2	3	5	−2	2
4	India	3	0	3	1	6	−5	0

Source: OCA

Date		Score		Regu 1	Regu 2	Regu 3
16 Nov	Iran	0–2	Thailand	0–2	0–2	
16 Nov	India	0–2	South Korea	1–2	1–2	
17 Nov	India	1–2	Iran	1–2	2–1	0–2
17 Nov	India	0–2	Thailand	0–2	0–2	
17 Nov	Iran	1–2	South Korea	1–2	2–0	0–2
18 Nov	Thailand	2–0	South Korea	2–0	2–0	

=== Women's trios ===
Pos	Team	Pld	W	L	SF	SA	SD	Pts
1	Laos	3	3	0	6	0	+6	6
2	Myanmar	3	2	1	4	2	+2	4
3	South Korea	3	1	2	2	4	−2	2
4	India	3	0	3	0	6	−6	0

Source: OCA

Date		Score		Set 1	Set 2	Set 3
19 Nov	South Korea	0–2	Laos	18–21	21–23	
19 Nov	India	0–2	Myanmar	9–21	8–21	
19 Nov	South Korea	2–0	India	21–14	21–5	
19 Nov	Laos	2–0	Myanmar	21–14	21–17	
20 Nov	South Korea	0–2	Myanmar	16–21	16–21	
20 Nov	Laos	2–0	India	21–6	21–13	

=== Women's regu ===
==== Preliminary round ====
===== Group A =====
Pos	Team	Pld	W	L	SF	SA	SD	Pts
1	Thailand	2	2	0	4	0	+4	4
2	Laos	2	1	1	2	2	0	2
3	China	2	0	2	0	4	−4	0

Source: OCA

Date		Score		Set 1	Set 2	Set 3
21 Nov	China	0–2	Thailand	6–21	5–21	
21 Nov	China	0–2	Laos	22–24	19–21	
22 Nov	Laos	0–2	Thailand	13–21	8–21	

===== Group B =====
Pos	Team	Pld	W	L	SF	SA	SD	Pts
1	Vietnam	2	2	0	4	0	+4	4
2	Indonesia	2	1	1	2	2	0	2
3	Myanmar	2	0	2	0	4	−4	0

Source: OCA

Date		Score		Set 1	Set 2	Set 3
21 Nov	Indonesia	2–0	Myanmar	23–21	21–14	
21 Nov	Myanmar	0–2	Vietnam	20–22	20–22	
22 Nov	Indonesia	0–2	Vietnam	13–21	19–21	

==== Knockout round ====
Semifinals; 22 November			Final; 23 November
Vietnam	21	21
Laos	16	17	Vietnam	8	12
Thailand	21	21	Thailand	21	21
Indonesia	4	10

=== Women's team regu ===
Pos	Team	Pld	W	L	MF	MA	MD	Pts
1	Thailand	3	3	0	6	0	+6	6
2	Vietnam	3	2	1	4	2	+2	4
3	South Korea	3	1	2	2	4	−2	2
4	China	3	0	3	0	6	−6	0

Source: OCA

Date		Score		Regu 1	Regu 2	Regu 3
16 Nov	South Korea	0–2	Thailand	0–2	0–2	
16 Nov	China	0–2	Vietnam	1–2	0–2	
17 Nov	South Korea	0–2	Vietnam	0–2	0–2	
17 Nov	Thailand	2–0	China	2–0	2–0	
18 Nov	Thailand	2–0	Vietnam	2–0	2–0	
18 Nov	South Korea	2–0	China	2–1	2–0	
