= Uzbekistan at the 2014 Asian Beach Games =

- IOC code: UZB
- NOC: National Olympic Committee of the Republic of Uzbekistan

in Phuket
- Medals Ranked 12th: Gold 4 Silver 0 Bronze 6 Total 10

Asian Beach Games appearances
- 2008; 2010; 2012; 2014; 2016; 2026

Uzbekistan participated in the 2014 Asian Beach Games in Phuket, Thailand from 14 to 23 November 2014. It won 4 gold and 6 silver medals.

== Medal summary ==
=== Medal by sport ===
Medals by sport
Sport	1st place, gold medalist(s)	2nd place, silver medalist(s)	3rd place, bronze medalist(s)	Total
Kurash	2	0	0	2
Muaythai	2	0	0	2
Sambo	0	0	5	5
Triathlon	0	0	1	1
Total	4	0	6	10

=== Medal by Date ===
Medals by date
Day	Date	1st place, gold medalist(s)	2nd place, silver medalist(s)	3rd place, bronze medalist(s)	Total
–1	12 Nov	0	0	4	4
0	13 Nov	0	0	1	1
1	14 Nov	0	0	0	0
2	15 Nov	0	0	1	1
3	16 Nov	2	0	0	2
4	17 Nov	0	0	0	0
5	18 Nov	0	0	0	0
6	19 Nov	0	0	0	0
7	20 Nov	0	0	0	0
8	21 Nov	0	0	0	0
9	22 Nov	2	0	0	2
10	23 Nov	0	0	0	0
Total		4	0	6	10
