= Kyrgyzstan at the 2014 Asian Beach Games =

- IOC code: KGZ
- NOC: National Olympic Committee of the Republic of Kyrgyzstan

in Phuket
- Medals Ranked 28th: Gold 0 Silver 3 Bronze 3 Total 6

Asian Beach Games appearances
- 2008; 2010; 2012; 2014; 2016; 2026

Kyrgyzstan participated in the 2014 Asian Beach Games in Phuket, Thailand from 14 to 23 November 2014.

== Medal summary ==
=== Medal by sport ===
Medals by sport
Sport	1st place, gold medalist(s)	2nd place, silver medalist(s)	3rd place, bronze medalist(s)	Total
Beach Modern Pentathlon	0	0	1	1
Beach Wrestling	0	1	0	1
Muaythai	0	1	2	3
Sambo	0	1	0	1
Total	0	3	3	6

=== Medal by Date ===
Medals by date
Day	Date	1st place, gold medalist(s)	2nd place, silver medalist(s)	3rd place, bronze medalist(s)	Total
–1	12 Nov	0	1	0	1
0	13 Nov	0	0	0	0
1	14 Nov	0	0	0	0
2	15 Nov	0	0	0	0
3	16 Nov	0	0	0	0
4	17 Nov	0	1	0	1
5	18 Nov	0	0	0	0
6	19 Nov	0	0	0	0
7	20 Nov	0	0	1	1
8	21 Nov	0	0	2	2
9	22 Nov	0	1	0	1
10	23 Nov	0	0	0	0
Total		0	3	3	6
