= Caren Chammas =

Lebanese judoka

Personal information
- Born: 29 June 1993 (age 33) Amioun, Lebanon
- Home town: Beirut, Lebanon
- Occupation: Judoka
- Height: 1.69 m (5 ft 7 in)

Sport
- Country: Lebanon
- Sport: Judo
- Weight class: ‍–‍63 kg, ‍–‍70 kg
- Coached by: Fady Saikaly

Achievements and titles
- Olympic Games: R32 (2012)
- World Champ.: R64 (2011)
- Asian Champ.: 7th (2013)
Medal record
Women's judo
Representing Lebanon
IJF Grand Prix
Bronze medal – third place	2012 Abu Dhabi	‍–‍70 kg
Asian Junior Championships
Silver medal – second place	2009 Beirut	‍–‍63 kg
Bronze medal – third place	2011 Beirut	‍–‍63 kg
Pan Arab Games
Silver medal – second place	2011 Doha	Open
Bronze medal – third place	2011 Doha	‍–‍63 kg
Women's sambo
Asian Beach Games
Silver medal – second place	2014 Phuket	‍–‍64 kg
Women's kurash
Asian Beach Games
Silver medal – second place	2014 Phuket	‍–‍63 kg

Profile at external databases
- IJF: 2196
- JudoInside.com: 64663
- Updated on 29 December 2022

Caren Chammas (also spelled Karen Shammas, born 29 June 1993) is a Lebanese judoka. Chammas competed at the Singapore 2010 Youth Games and was placed 7th worldwide, Continental Championships U20, and the 2012 Olympic Games where she tied for last place as she was defeated in the first round. Chammas is the first female judoka to ever participate for Lebanon in the Olympic Games.
