= Vietnam at the 2014 Asian Beach Games =

- IOC code: VIE
- NOC: Vietnam Olympic Committee
- Website: www.voc.org.vn (in Vietnamese and English)

in Phuket
- Competitors: 148 (88 men & 60 women) in 18 sports
- Medals Ranked 5th: Gold 8 Silver 12 Bronze 20 Total 40

Asian Beach Games appearances
- 2008; 2010; 2012; 2014; 2016; 2026

Vietnam participated in the 2014 Asian Beach Games in Phuket, Thailand from 14 to 23 November 2014.

Vietnam also won 8 gold medals, 12 silver medals, 20 bronze medals and a total of 40 medals, finishing fifth on the medal table.

== Competitors ==
Sport	Men	Women	Total
Air Sports	3	0	3
Beach Athletics	6	6	12
Beach Handball	17	10	27
Beach Sepaktakraw	2	11	13
Beach Soccer	13	0	13
Beach Volleyball	4	4	8
Beach Wrestling	3	3	6
Bodybuilding	3	0	3
Extreme Sports	3	0	3
Foot Volley	3	0	3
Ju-jitsu	7	6	13
Kurash	2	3	5
Marathon Swimming	2	2	4
Muaythai	4	4	8
Petanque	8	6	14
Triathlon	1	0	1
WaterSki	1	0	1
Woodball	6	5	11
Total	88	60	148

== Medal summary ==
=== Medal by sport ===
Medals by sport
Sport	1st place, gold medalist(s)	2nd place, silver medalist(s)	3rd place, bronze medalist(s)	Total
Beach Athletics	0	1	0	1
Beach Handball	0	0	1	1
Beach Sepaktakraw	0	2	0	2
Beach Wrestling	0	1	2	3
Bodybuilding	2	1	0	3
Ju-jitsu	0	2	6	8
Kurash	1	0	2	3
Muaythai	2	2	4	8
Petanque	2	3	2	7
Woodball	1	0	3	4
Total	8	12	20	40

=== Medal by Date ===
Medals by date
Day	Date	1st place, gold medalist(s)	2nd place, silver medalist(s)	3rd place, bronze medalist(s)	Total
0	13 Nov	0	2	6	8
1	14 Nov	0	0	2	2
2	15 Nov	1	0	1	2
3	16 Nov	1	2	1	4
4	17 Nov	1	1	4	6
5	18 Nov	0	1	1	2
6	19 Nov	0	0	0	0
7	20 Nov	1	1	2	4
8	21 Nov	0	0	2	2
9	22 Nov	4	4	1	9
10	23 Nov	0	1	0	1
Total		8	12	20	40

=== Medalists ===
Medal	Name	Sport	Event	Date
Gold	Nguyễn Hải Âu	Bodybuilding	Bantam Weight up to 165 cm	22 Nov 2014
Gold	Se Pha	Bodybuilding	Light Weight up to 168 cm	22 Nov 2014
Gold	Văn Ngọc Tú	Kurash	Women –52 kg	15 Nov 2014
Gold	Nguyễn Trần Duy Nhật	Muaythai	Men's 57 kg	22 Nov 2014
Gold	Bùi Yến Ly	Muaythai	Women's 54 kg	22 Nov 2014
Gold	Team: Cao Phú Thịnh; Lý Ngọc Tài; Nguyễn Xuân Lộc	Petanque	Men's Team	20 Nov 2014
Gold	Team: Lê Thị Thu Mai; Thạch Tuấn Thành	Petanque	Pétanque Mixed Doubles	16 Nov 2014
Gold	Team: Nguyễn Huyền Trang; Nguyễn Thị Phương; Phan Thị Phương; Phùng Thị Thương	Woodball	W Fairway Team	17 Nov 2014
Silver	Bùi Thị Thu Thảo	Beach Athletics	Women's Long Jump	22 Nov 2014
Silver	Team: Trần Thị Thu Hằng; Trần Hồng Nhung; Đỗ Thị Nguyên; Nguyễn Thái Linh; Trần Thị Việt Mỹ; Phạm Thị Nguyệt	Beach Sepaktakraw	Women's Beach Regu	23 Nov 2014
Silver	Team: Trần Thị Thu Hằng; Trần Hồng Nhung; Nguyễn Thị Mỹ; Phạm Thị Lan; Vũ Thùy Linh; Đỗ Thị Nguyên; Lưu Thị Kim Thủy; Nguyễn Thái Linh; Trần Thị Việt Mỹ; Phạm Thị Nguyệt	Beach Sepaktakraw	Women's Beach Team	18 Nov 2014
Silver	Nguyễn Thị Nga	Beach Wrestling	Women's Freestyle –60 kg	16 Nov 2014
Silver	Trần Hữu Thuần	Bodybuilding	Welter Weight up to 172 cm	22 Nov 2014
Silver	Nguyễn Thị Hương	Ju-jitsu	Women +60 kg	13 Nov 2014
Silver	Đào Lê Thu Trang	Ju-jitsu	Women –50 kg	13 Nov 2014
Silver	Lê Hoàng Đức	Muaythai	Men's 48 kg	22 Nov 2014
Silver	Nguyễn Thị Thanh Trúc	Muaythai	Women's 48 kg	22 Nov 2014
Silver	Team: Ngô Ron; Võ Minh Luân	Petanque	Pétanque Men Doubles	16 Nov 2014
Silver	Trần Lê Thành Thảo	Petanque	Shooting Women	17 Nov 2014
Silver	Team: Nguyễn Thị Cẩm D. Ngô Thị Huyền T. Phạm Thị Huệ; Nguyễn Thị Hiền	Petanque	Women's Team	20 Nov 2014
Bronze	Team: Nguyễn Thị Huyền Trang; Đoàn Thị Phương My; Nguyễn Thị Trà My; Hà Thị Hạnh; Châu Ngọc Thùy Dung; Lê Thị Thanh Phùng; Nguyễn Kim Oanh; Hứa Thị Thu Nga; Võ Ngọc Hiếu; Nguyễn Thị Kim Thu	Beach Handball	Women's	22 Nov 2014
Bronze	Lương Thị Sấm	Beach Wrestling	Women's Freestyle +60 kg	17 Nov 2014
Bronze	Nguyễn Thị Xuân	Beach Wrestling	Women's Freestyle –50 kg	15 Nov 2014
Bronze	Nguyễn Thị Lan	Ju-jitsu	Women +60 kg	13 Nov 2014
Bronze	Hà Anh Thự	Ju-jitsu	Women –50 kg	13 Nov 2014
Bronze	Nguyễn Thị Thanh Thúy	Ju-jitsu	Women –60 kg	13 Nov 2014
Bronze	Nguyễn Thị Quỳnh	Ju-jitsu	Women –60 kg	13 Nov 2014
Bronze	Nguyễn Thị Thanh Thúy; Đào Lê Thu Trang	Ju-jitsu	Women Duo	13 Nov 2014
Bronze	Đào Lê Thu Trang; Lê Tiến Thành	Ju-jitsu	Duo Mixed	13 Nov 2014
Bronze	Lê Thị Tình	Kurash	Women –57 kg	16 Nov 2014
Bronze	Nguyễn Thị Hương	Kurash	Women –63 kg	17 Nov 2014
Bronze	Nguyễn Đoàn Long	Muaythai	Men's 60 kg	21 Nov 2014
Bronze	Võ Văn Đại	Muaythai	Men's 63.5 kg	21 Nov 2014
Bronze	Bùi Thị Quỳnh	Muaythai	Women 51 kg	20 Nov 2014
Bronze	Nguyễn Thị Ngọc	Muaythai	Women 60 kg	20 Nov 2014
Bronze	Vũ Khánh Duy	Petanque	Pétanque Men Singles	18 Nov 2014
Bronze	Trần Ngọc Kiệt	Petanque	Shooting Men	17 Nov 2014
Bronze	Team: Trần Quang Dũng; Cao Hoàng Anh; Trần Duy Anh; Phạm Công Thành	Woodball	M Fairway Team	17 Nov 2014
Bronze	Nguyễn Huyền Trang	Woodball	W Fairway	14 Nov 2014
Bronze	Phan Thị Phương	Woodball	W Fairway	14 Nov 2014

=== Multiple Gold Medalists ===
Name	Sport	Gold	Silver	Bronze	Total
Nguyễn Huyền Trang	Woodball	1	0	1	2
Phan Thị Phương	Woodball	1	0	1	2
Đỗ Thị Nguyễn	Beach Sepaktakraw	0	2	0	2
Nguyễn Thái Linh	Beach Sepaktakraw	0	2	0	2
Phạm Thị Nguyệt	Beach Sepaktakraw	0	2	0	2
Trần Hồng Nhung	Beach Sepaktakraw	0	2	0	2
Trần Thị Thu Hằng	Beach Sepaktakraw	0	2	0	2
Trần Thị Việt Mỹ	Beach Sepaktakraw	0	2	0	2
Đào Lê Thu Trang	Ju-jitsu	0	1	2	3
Nguyễn Thị Thanh Thúy	Ju-jitsu	0	0	2	2
