= Laos at the 2014 Asian Beach Games =

- IOC code: LAO
- NOC: National Olympic Committee of Lao

in Phuket
- Medals Ranked 18th: Gold 2 Silver 2 Bronze 8 Total 12

Asian Beach Games appearances
- 2008; 2010; 2012; 2014; 2016; 2026

Laos participated in the 2014 Asian Beach Games in Phuket, Thailand from 14 to 23 November 2014. Khoun Souksavat clinched Laos' first Asian Beach Games Gold Medal in Shooting Women Petanque.

Laos ended their campaign with 2 gold medals, 2 silver medals, 8 bronze medals and a total of 12 medals, finishing eighteenth on the medal table. The Laos Team achieved its best finish since the start of the Beach Games.

== Medal summary ==
=== Medal by sport ===
Medals by sport
Sport	1st place, gold medalist(s)	2nd place, silver medalist(s)	3rd place, bronze medalist(s)	Total
Beach Sepaktakraw	1	0	3	4
Petanque	1	2	5	8
Total	2	2	8	12

=== Medal by Date ===
Medals by date
Day	Date	1st place, gold medalist(s)	2nd place, silver medalist(s)	3rd place, bronze medalist(s)	Total
–1	12 Nov	0	0	0	0
0	13 Nov	0	0	0	0
1	14 Nov	0	0	0	0
2	15 Nov	0	0	0	0
3	16 Nov	0	0	2	2
4	17 Nov	1	1	0	2
5	18 Nov	0	1	1	2
6	19 Nov	0	0	0	0
7	20 Nov	1	0	3	4
8	21 Nov	0	0	0	0
9	22 Nov	0	0	2	2
10	23 Nov	0	0	0	0
Total		2	2	8	12
