= Lebanon at the 2014 Asian Beach Games =

- IOC code: LIB
- NOC: Lebanese Olympic Committee

in Phuket
- Medals Ranked 17th: Gold 2 Silver 3 Bronze 3 Total 8

Asian Beach Games appearances
- 2008; 2010; 2012; 2014; 2016; 2026

Lebanon participated in the 2014 Asian Beach Games in Phuket, Thailand from 14 to 23 November 2014. Nacif Elias clinched Lebanon' first Asian Beach Games Gold Medal in Men 90 kg Kurash.

== Medal summary ==
=== Medal by sport ===
Medals by sport
Sport	1st place, gold medalist(s)	2nd place, silver medalist(s)	3rd place, bronze medalist(s)	Total
Ju-Jitsu	0	0	1	1
Kurash	1	1	0	2
Muaythai	0	1	2	3
Sambo	0	1	0	1
WaterSki	1	0	0	1
Total	2	3	3	8

=== Medal by Date ===
Medals by date
Day	Date	1st place, gold medalist(s)	2nd place, silver medalist(s)	3rd place, bronze medalist(s)	Total
–1	12 Nov	0	1	1	2
0	13 Nov	0	0	0	0
1	14 Nov	0	0	0	0
2	15 Nov	0	0	0	0
3	16 Nov	0	0	0	0
4	17 Nov	1	1	0	2
5	18 Nov	0	0	0	0
6	19 Nov	0	0	0	0
7	20 Nov	1	0	0	1
8	21 Nov	0	0	2	2
9	22 Nov	0	1	0	1
10	23 Nov	0	0	0	0
Total		2	3	3	8
