= Mongolia at the 2014 Asian Beach Games =

- IOC code: MGL
- NOC: Mongolian National Olympic Committee

in Phuket
- Medals Ranked 9th: Gold 6 Silver 0 Bronze 4 Total 10

Asian Beach Games appearances
- 2008; 2010; 2012; 2014; 2016; 2026

Mongolia participated in the 2014 Asian Beach Games in Phuket, Thailand from 14 to 23 November 2014.

== Medal summary ==
=== Medal by sport ===
Medals by sport
Sport	1st place, gold medalist(s)	2nd place, silver medalist(s)	3rd place, bronze medalist(s)	Total
Ju-Jitsu	2	0	1	3
Kurash	0	0	1	1
Muaythai	0	0	1	1
Sambo	4	0	1	5
Total	6	0	4	10

=== Medalists ===
Medal	Athlete	Sport	Event	Date
Gold	Davaadorjiin Tömörkhüleg	Beach sambo	Men's 68 kg	12 November
Gold	Gany Tüvshinjargal	Beach sambo	Men's 82 kg	
Gold	Tümen-Odyn Battögs	Beach sambo	Women's 64 kg	
Gold	Bataagiin Sainbuyan	Beach sambo	Women's 82 kg	
Bronze	Mongolia; Davaadorjiin Tömörkhüleg; Ganyn Tüvshinjargal; Batbayaryn Ariun-Erdene; Sampilyn Solongogerel; Tümen-Odyn Battögs; Bataagiin Sainbuyan	Beach sambo	Mixed team	13 November
Gold	Sumiyaagiin Batgal	Ju-jitsu	Men's ne-waza 60 kg	13 November
Bronze	Odsürengiin Bold-Erdene	Ju-jitsu	Men's ne-waza 90 kg	13 November
Gold	Battsogtyn Buyandelger	Ju-jitsu	Women's ne-waza +60 kg	13 November
Bronze	Altangereliin Davaanyam	Beach kurash	Men's +90 kg	17 November
Bronze	Sergelenbayaryn Myadagmaa	Muay	Women's 54 kg	21 November
