= Turkmenistan at the 2014 Asian Beach Games =

- IOC code: TKM
- NOC: National Olympic Committee of Turkmenistan

in Phuket
- Medals Ranked 23rd: Gold 1 Silver 3 Bronze 7 Total 11

Asian Beach Games appearances
- 2010; 2012; 2014; 2016; 2026

Turkmenistan participated in the 2014 Asian Beach Games in Phuket, Thailand from 14 to 23 November 2014.

== Medal summary ==
=== Medal by sport ===
Medals by sport
Sport	1st place, gold medalist(s)	2nd place, silver medalist(s)	3rd place, bronze medalist(s)	Total
Beach Wrestling	0	1	0	1
Ju-Jitsu	0	0	1	1
Kurash	0	0	3	3
Muaythai	0	0	1	1
Petanque	0	0	1	1
Sambo	1	2	1	4
Total	1	3	7	11

=== Medal by Date ===
Medals by date
Day	Date	1st place, gold medalist(s)	2nd place, silver medalist(s)	3rd place, bronze medalist(s)	Total
–1	12 Nov	1	1	1	3
0	13 Nov	0	1	1	2
1	14 Nov	0	0	0	0
2	15 Nov	0	0	2	2
3	16 Nov	0	1	1	2
4	17 Nov	0	0	0	0
5	18 Nov	0	0	0	0
6	19 Nov	0	0	0	0
7	20 Nov	0	0	1	1
8	21 Nov	0	0	1	1
9	22 Nov	0	0	0	0
10	23 Nov	0	0	0	0
Total		1	3	7	11
