= Pakistan at the 2014 Asian Beach Games =

- IOC code: PAK
- NOC: Pakistan Olympic Association

in Phuket
- Competitors: 65 in 8 sports
- Medals Ranked 16th: Gold 2 Silver 4 Bronze 4 Total 10

Asian Beach Games appearances
- 2008; 2010; 2012; 2014; 2016; 2026

Pakistan participated in the 2014 Asian Beach Games in Phuket, Thailand from 14 to 23 November 2014. It will participate in the beach handball, beach kabaddi, beach wrestling, bodybuilding, ju-jitsu, sailing, squash and windsurfing events.

== Medal summary ==
=== Medal by sport ===
Medals by sport
Sport	1st place, gold medalist(s)	2nd place, silver medalist(s)	3rd place, bronze medalist(s)	Total
Beach Handball	0	0	1	1
Beach Kabaddi	0	1	0	1
Beach Wrestling	0	0	2	2
Ju-Jitsu	2	3	0	5
Squash	0	0	1	1
Total	2	4	4	10

=== Medal by Date ===
Medals by date
Day	Date	1st place, gold medalist(s)	2nd place, silver medalist(s)	3rd place, bronze medalist(s)	Total
–1	12 Nov	2	1	0	3
0	13 Nov	0	2	0	2
1	14 Nov	0	0	0	0
2	15 Nov	0	0	1	1
3	16 Nov	0	0	1	1
4	17 Nov	0	0	1	1
5	18 Nov	0	0	0	0
6	19 Nov	0	0	0	0
7	20 Nov	0	0	0	0
8	21 Nov	0	0	0	0
9	22 Nov	0	0	1	1
10	23 Nov	0	1	0	1
Total		2	4	4	10
