= Cambodia at the 2014 Asian Beach Games =

- IOC code: CAM
- NOC: National Olympic Committee of Cambodia
- Website: www.noccambodia.org (in Khmer and English)

in Phuket
- Medals Ranked 36th: Gold 0 Silver 0 Bronze 1 Total 1

Asian Beach Games appearances
- 2008; 2010; 2012; 2014; 2016

Cambodia participated in the 2014 Asian Beach Games held in Phuket, Thailand, from 14 to 23 November 2014.

== Medal summary ==
Cambodia won a bronze medal in beach wrestling.
