= Nacif Elias =

Brazilian judoka (born 1988)

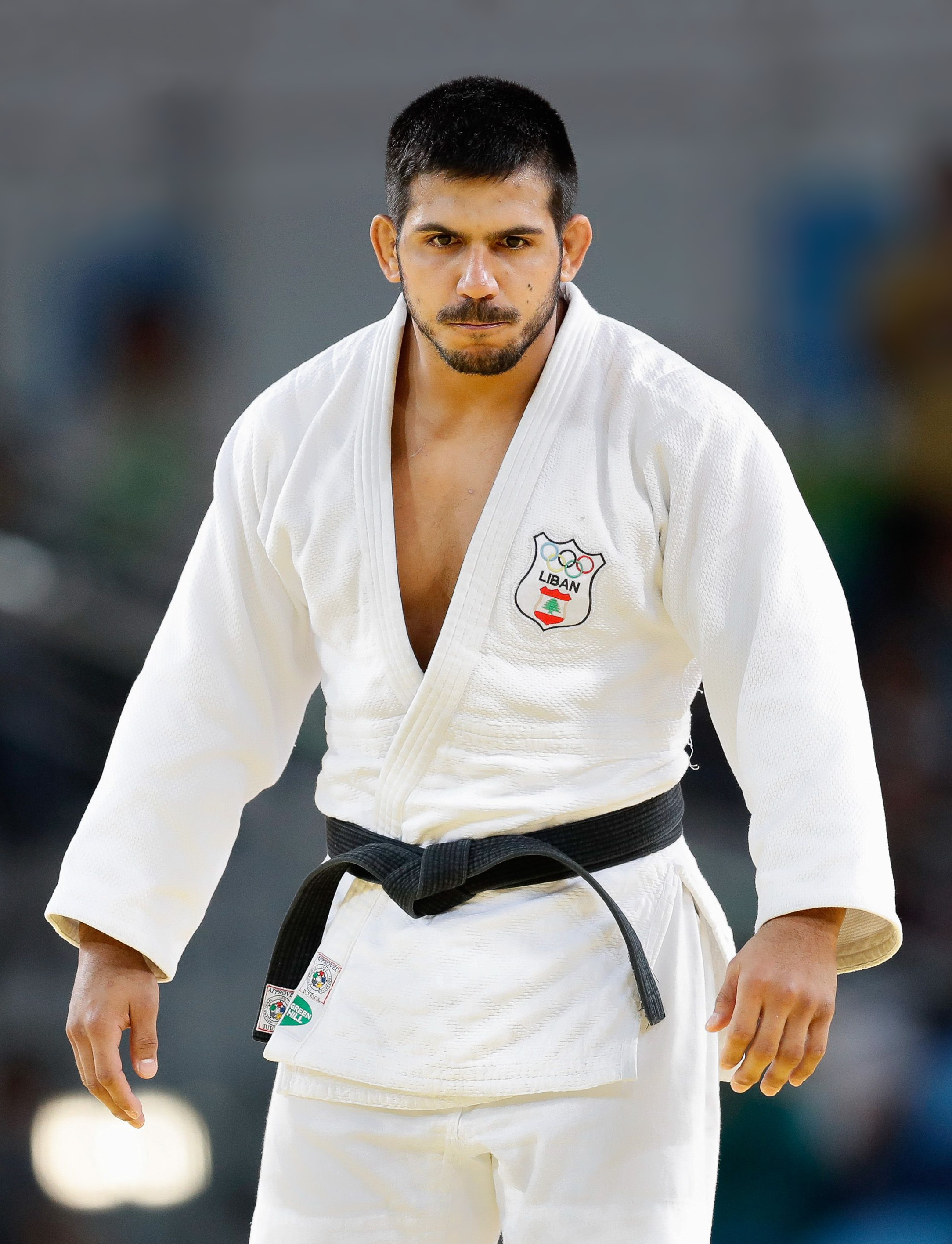
- Elias at the 2016 Olympics

Personal information
- Born: 29 September 1988 (age 37) Vitoria, Brazil
- Occupation: Judoka
- Height: 172 cm (5 ft 8 in)

Sport
- Country: Brazil (2009–13); Lebanon (since 2013)
- Sport: Judo
- Weight class: ‍–‍81 kg, ‍–‍90 kg
- Club: Bouddha Club

Achievements and titles
- Olympic Games: R32 (2016, 2020)
- World Champ.: 7th (2014)
- Asian Champ.: (silver) (2014, 2016)
Medal record
Men's judo
Representing Brazil
IJF Grand Slam
| Silver medal – second place | 2009 Rio de Janeiro | ‍–‍81 kg |
Representing Lebanon
Asian Games
| Silver medal – second place | 2014 Incheon | ‍–‍81 kg |
Asian Championships
| Silver medal – second place | 2016 Tashkent | ‍–‍81 kg |
IJF Grand Prix
| Bronze medal – third place | 2018 Cancún | ‍–‍90 kg |

Profile at external databases
- IJF: 11407, 432
- JudoInside.com: 52884
- Updated on 28 November 2022

Nacif Elias (Arabic: ناصيف إلياس; born 29 September 1988) is a Brazilian-born Lebanese judoka.

== Career ==
Elias competed at the 2016 Summer Olympics in the 81 kg event, in which he was eliminated in the second round, in his first match, by Emmanuel Lucenti. He was the flagbearer for Lebanon during the opening ceremonies of the 2014 Asian Games and 2016 Olympics.

== Personal life ==
Elias was born in Brazil, but his great-grandfather was Lebanese. In 2013 he changed nationality to represent Lebanon, while staying in Brazil. In order to compete for Lebanon, Elias had been invited to become a Lebanese citizen. "It was a tough call," he said, but the offer he received from the Lebanese Judo Federation made it hard to refuse. "Lebanon offered to pay me to enter eight competitions per year, whereas the Brazilian national team would pay for three or four at most," he said.

Elias is married and has one son.
