= Afghanistan at the 2014 Asian Beach Games =

- IOC code: AFG
- NOC: Afghanistan National Olympic Committee

in Phuket
- Medals Ranked 30th: Gold 0 Silver 2 Bronze 2 Total 4

Asian Beach Games appearances
- 2008; 2010; 2012; 2014; 2016; 2026

Afghanistan has participated in the 2014 Asian Beach Games in Phuket, Thailand from 14 to 23 November 2014.

== Medal summary ==
=== Medal by sport ===
Medals by sport
Sport	1st place, gold medalist(s)	2nd place, silver medalist(s)	3rd place, bronze medalist(s)	Total
Kurash	0	1	1	2
Muaythai	0	1	1	2
Total	0	2	2	4

=== Medal by Date ===
Medals by date
Day	Date	1st place, gold medalist(s)	2nd place, silver medalist(s)	3rd place, bronze medalist(s)	Total
–1	12 Nov	0	0	0	0
0	13 Nov	0	0	0	0
1	14 Nov	0	0	0	0
2	15 Nov	0	0	0	0
3	16 Nov	0	0	0	0
4	17 Nov	0	1	1	2
5	18 Nov	0	0	0	0
6	19 Nov	0	0	0	0
7	20 Nov	0	0	0	0
8	21 Nov	0	0	1	1
9	22 Nov	0	1	0	1
10	23 Nov	0	0	0	0
Total		0	2	2	4
