= Bobirjon Tagaev =

Uzbek Muay Thai kickboxer

- Born: April 5, 1993 (age 33); Samarkand, Uzbekistan
- Other names: Bobir Tagiev
- Nationality: Uzbekistan
- Height: 180 cm (5 ft 11 in)
- Weight: 154 lb (70 kg; 11 st 0 lb)
- Division: Welterweight
- Style: Muay Thai
- Stance: Orthodox
- Team: Tiger Muay Thai

Kickboxing record
- Total: 75
- Wins: 67
- Losses: 8

Bobirjon Tagaev (uzb: Bobirjon Tagaev Sobirjon ugli, Cyrillic: Тагаев Бобиржон born April 5, 1993, in Samarkand, Uzbekistan) is a professional Uzbek Muay Thai kickboxer. He competed at Asian Beach Games 2014, 2016 and won Gold medal of Games in 63.5 kg weight category in 2014

== Muay Thai career ==
Amateur

In 2014 and 2016 Tagaev took part at the 2014 Asian Beach Games and won Gold medal of Asian Beach Games 2014 in 63.5 kg weight category

Round of 16:: Defeated Ameer Ibrahim (IRQ) 5–0

Quarter-finals: Defeated Jonathan Polosan (PHI) 5–0

Semi-finals: Defeated Võ Văn Đài (VIE) KOB

Finals: Defeated Yuan Bing (CHN) 5–0

World Muay Thai Championships 2014 Thailand - 3rd

=== In 2015 at Muaythai University World Cup ===
The 63.5 kg Tagaev Bobirjon won against Thailand's Suphamongkol Pongpeera in the final and obtained Gold medal of World Cup

Professional Career

As a professional fighter made total 73 fights and won 65 from them.

Top King World Series 2017 1st

2017 EM Legend World 67 kg Champion

== Muay Thai record ==
Muaythai record
Date	Result	Opponent	Event	Location	Method	Round	Time
2026-09-26	Win	(Ghana) Elad Suman	Mangu Professional League 5	Tashkent, Uzbekistan	Decision (Unanimous)	3	3:00
2026-06-06	Win	(Romania) Alex Bublea	Mangu Professional League 3	Samarkand, Uzbekistan	TKO	1	2:28
2022-03-26	Loss	(Russia) Jamal Yusupov	Vendetta 25	Istanbul, Turkey	Decision (Unanimous)	3	3:00
2022-02-26	Loss	(France) Valentin Thibaut	Muaythai Night	Dubai, UAE	Decision	5	3:00
For the WMC Intercontinental 154 lbs title.
2020-01-17	Win	(Azerbaijan) Yusuf Memmedov	Pitbull Promotion	Turkey	Decision	3	3:00
2019-11-15	Loss	(Thailand) Sitthichai Sitsongpeenong	Macau Fight 2019	Macau	Ext.R Decision (Unanimous)	4	3:00
2018-12-22	Loss	(Thailand) Satanfah Rachanon	THAI FIGHT Nakhon Ratchasima	Nakhon Ratchasima, Thailand	Decision	3	3:00
For the 2018 THAI FIGHT 70kg / 154lbs title.
2018-04-01	Loss	(Thailand) Samingdej Dejphaeng	Real Hero, Tournament Final	Bangkok, Thailand	Decision	1	5:00
For the Real Hero Tournament title.
2018-04-01	Win	(Thailand) Buakiew Sitsongpeenong	Real Hero, Tournament Semi Final	Bangkok, Thailand	Decision	1	5:00
2018-04-01	Win	(Brazil) Carlos Bezerra	Real Hero, Tournament Quarter Final	Bangkok, Thailand	TKO (Punches)	1	0:41
2017-10-15	Win	(Russia) Dmitry Grafov	EM Legend 24, Final	Emei, China	TKO	1	1:55
Wins the EM-Legend 67 kg title.
2017-10-15	Win	(Thailand) Chukchai	EM Legend 24, Semifinals	Emei, China	TKO	1	1:55
2017-08-05	Win	(Russia) Arbi Emiev	Topking World Series	Narathiwat province, Thailand	Decision	3	3:00
2016-10-15	Loss	(Thailand) PayakSamui Lukjaoporongtom	THAI FIGHT Chengdu	Chengdu, China	Decision	5	3:00
2016-09-25	Loss	(Russia) Timur Mamazatikov	MAX Muay Thai	Pattaya, Thailand	Decision	3	3:00
2016-04-02	Loss	(Thailand) Singmanee Kaewsamrit	Emei Legend 7, 65 kg Tournament, Group C final	China	TKO	2	
Legend: Win Loss Draw/No contest Notes

== Mixed martial arts record ==
Result	Record	Opponent	Method	Event	Date	Round	Time	Location	Notes
Win	7–1	Valeriy Bulat	Submission	BFC Contender Series	December 17, 2025	1		Minsk, Belarus	
Win	6–1	Nikolay Befus	Submission (Forearm choke)	BFC 84	September 19, 2025	1	1:36	Minsk, Belarus	
Win	5–1	Roman Novikov	TKO (Ground and pound)	BFC Contender Series	May 30, 2025	1	—	Minsk, Belarus	
Win	4–1	Aleksey Ivanov	TKO (Punches & knees)	WEF 134: Zhenishbekov vs. Serikpulov	June 23, 2024	1	0:55	Kyzyl-Kiya, Kyrgyzstan	
Win	3–1	Mekhkan Devanov	TKO (Punches)	WEF 133: Battle in the Mountains	June 8, 2024	1	0:24	Toktogul, Kyrgyzstan	
Win	2–1	Mike Johnson	TKO (Strikes)	CLIP MMA: The Takeover	June 24, 2023	1	4:30	Muskegon, Michigan, United States	
Loss	1–1	Jontae McCowan	Decision (Unanimous)	Xtreme Fight Night 384	December 16, 2022	3	—	Tulsa, Oklahoma, United States	
Win	1–0	Derek Reyes	TKO (Strikes)	CLIP: Motor City Cagefights 11	August 19, 2022	1	1:10	Detroit, Michigan, United States	
