= Muaythai at the 2014 Asian Beach Games =

- Venue: Patong Beach
- Dates: 18–22 November 2014

Muaythai competition at the 2014 Asian Beach Games was held in Phuket, Thailand from 18 to 22 November 2014 at Patong Beach, Phuket. There were six women's events in original program but light welterweight event was cancelled due to lack of entries.

== Medalists ==
=== Men ===
Event	Gold	Silver	Bronze
Light flyweight 45–48 kg	Suepphong Phromduea; Thailand	Lê Hoàng Đức; Vietnam	Aisamudin Maula Tajudin; Malaysia
Light flyweight 45–48 kg	Suepphong Phromduea; Thailand	Lê Hoàng Đức; Vietnam	Ramin Haidary; Afghanistan
Flyweight; 48–51 kg	Arnon Phonkrathok; Thailand	Abdullah Safdar; Afghanistan	Yousif Mahmood; Iraq
Flyweight; 48–51 kg	Arnon Phonkrathok; Thailand	Abdullah Safdar; Afghanistan	Manuel delos Reyes; Philippines
Bantamweight; 51–54 kg	Parin Luangpon; Thailand	Phillip Delarmino; Philippines	Ahmed Salam; Iraq
Bantamweight; 51–54 kg	Parin Luangpon; Thailand	Phillip Delarmino; Philippines	Kim Sang-jae; South Korea
Featherweight; 54–57 kg	Nguyễn Trần Duy Nhất; Vietnam	Nurym Kemal; Kazakhstan	Yasin Ahmadi; Iran
Featherweight; 54–57 kg	Nguyễn Trần Duy Nhất; Vietnam	Nurym Kemal; Kazakhstan	Mongkhon Artwichian; Thailand
Lightweight; 57–60 kg	Chokchai Artwichian; Thailand	Mirbek Sartkalmakov; Kyrgyzstan	Nguyễn Doãn Long; Vietnam
Lightweight; 57–60 kg	Chokchai Artwichian; Thailand	Mirbek Sartkalmakov; Kyrgyzstan	Alvin Berto; Philippines
Light welterweight 60–63.5 kg	Bobirjon Tagaev; Uzbekistan	Yuan Bing; China	Chin Ngai Chung; Hong Kong
Light welterweight 60–63.5 kg	Bobirjon Tagaev; Uzbekistan	Yuan Bing; China	Võ Văn Đài; Vietnam
Welterweight; 63.5–67 kg	Kaveh Soleimani; Iran	Akram Hasan; Iraq	Bekzhan Matysaev; Kyrgyzstan
Welterweight; 63.5–67 kg	Kaveh Soleimani; Iran	Akram Hasan; Iraq	Zhanserik Amirzhanov; Kazakhstan
Light middleweight 67–71 kg	Pattanaphong Surichay; Thailand	Rustem Akzhanov; Kazakhstan	Mirbek Kachkynbaev; Kyrgyzstan
Light middleweight 67–71 kg	Pattanaphong Surichay; Thailand	Rustem Akzhanov; Kazakhstan	Jomi Latifov; Tajikistan
Middleweight; 71–75 kg	Vadim Loparev; Kazakhstan	Hossein Karami; Iran	Mohammad Salama; Jordan
Middleweight; 71–75 kg	Vadim Loparev; Kazakhstan	Hossein Karami; Iran	Joel Zaspa; Philippines
Light heavyweight 75–81 kg	Kamoljon Kazimov; Uzbekistan	Mahmoud Sattari; Iran	Asmaiel Btaih; Syria
Light heavyweight 75–81 kg	Kamoljon Kazimov; Uzbekistan	Mahmoud Sattari; Iran	Kassem El-Khatib; Lebanon

=== Women ===
Event	Gold	Silver	Bronze
Light flyweight 45–48 kg	Rattanaphon Hanphan; Thailand	Nguyễn Thị Thanh Trúc; Vietnam	Wu Hoi Yan; Hong Kong
Light flyweight 45–48 kg	Rattanaphon Hanphan; Thailand	Nguyễn Thị Thanh Trúc; Vietnam	Ayu Arynafaiza Azmi; Malaysia
Flyweight; 48–51 kg	Parita Padpho; Thailand	Kim Min-ji; South Korea	Bùi Thị Quỳnh; Vietnam
Flyweight; 48–51 kg	Parita Padpho; Thailand	Kim Min-ji; South Korea	Yuan Anfei; China
Bantamweight; 51–54 kg	Bùi Yến Ly; Vietnam	Sopapan Likittrakul; Thailand	Germaine Yeap; Malaysia
Bantamweight; 51–54 kg	Bùi Yến Ly; Vietnam	Sopapan Likittrakul; Thailand	Sergelenbayaryn Myadagmaa; Mongolia
Featherweight; 54–57 kg	Rachadaporn Wihantamma; Thailand	Atyaf Mahmood; Iraq	Nabat Batyrowa; Turkmenistan
Featherweight; 54–57 kg	Rachadaporn Wihantamma; Thailand	Atyaf Mahmood; Iraq	Rima Sawah; Lebanon
Lightweight; 57–60 kg	Kesinee Tabtrai; Thailand	Rola Khaled; Lebanon	Nguyễn Thị Ngọc; Vietnam
Lightweight; 57–60 kg	Kesinee Tabtrai; Thailand	Rola Khaled; Lebanon	Bidhya Wati Rai; India

== Medal table ==
Rank	Nation	Gold	Silver	Bronze	Total
1	Thailand (THA)	9	1	1	11
2	Vietnam (VIE)	2	2	4	8
3	Uzbekistan (UZB)	2	0	0	2
4	Iran (IRI)	1	2	1	4
4	Kazakhstan (KAZ)	1	2	1	4
6	Iraq (IRQ)	0	2	2	4
7	Philippines (PHI)	0	1	3	4
8	Kyrgyzstan (KGZ)	0	1	2	3
8	Lebanon (LIB)	0	1	2	3
10	Afghanistan (AFG)	0	1	1	2
10	China (CHN)	0	1	1	2
10	South Korea (KOR)	0	1	1	2
13	Malaysia (MAS)	0	0	3	3
14	Hong Kong (HKG)	0	0	2	2
15	India (IND)	0	0	1	1
15	Jordan (JOR)	0	0	1	1
15	Mongolia (MGL)	0	0	1	1
15	Syria (SYR)	0	0	1	1
15	Tajikistan (TJK)	0	0	1	1
15	Turkmenistan (TKM)	0	0	1	1
Totals (20 entries)		15	15	30	60

== Results ==
=== Men ===
==== 48 kg ====
Quarterfinals; 18 November
Lê Hoàng Đức (VIE)	RSCO
Eugene Tan (SIN)
Ramin Haidary (AFG)	5
Chan Kai Tik (HKG)	0
Suepphong Phromduea (THA)	5
Hasan Mustafa (IRQ)	0

Semifinals; 21 November
Aisamudin Maula Tajudin (MAS)	0
Lê Hoàng Đức (VIE)	5
Ramin Haidary (AFG)	0
Suepphong Phromduea (THA)	5

Final; 22 November
Lê Hoàng Đức (VIE)	0
Suepphong Phromduea (THA)	5

==== 51 kg ====
Quarterfinals; 19 November		Semifinals; 21 November		Final; 22 November
Ho Kwok Keung (HKG)	1
Yousif Mahmood (IRQ)	4	Yousif Mahmood (IRQ)	0
Abdullah Safdar (AFG)	5	Abdullah Safdar (AFG)	5
Kobilbek Tulabaev (UZB)	0			Abdullah Safdar (AFG)	0
Arnon Phonkrathok (THA)	5			Arnon Phonkrathok (THA)	5
Yoon Deok-jae (KOR)	0	Arnon Phonkrathok (THA)	5
Manuel delos Reyes (PHI)	5	Manuel delos Reyes (PHI)	0
Aidil Che Omar (MAS)	0

==== 54 kg ====
Round of 16; 18 November
Ngursaimawia Sailo (IND)
Parin Luangpon (THA)	KOH

Quarterfinals; 20 November
Ahmed Salam (IRQ)	RSCO
Resul Araşow (TKM)
Phillip Delarmino (PHI)	RSCH
Aslamudin Amanullah (AFG)
Kim Sang-jae (KOR)	5
Wang Chenhao (CHN)	0
Ilyas Mussin (KAZ)	0
Parin Luangpon (THA)	5

Semifinals; 21 November
Ahmed Salam (IRQ)
Phillip Delarmino (PHI)	WO
Kim Sang-jae (KOR)	0
Parin Luangpon (THA)	5

Final; 22 November
Phillip Delarmino (PHI)	1
Parin Luangpon (THA)	4

==== 57 kg ====
Quarterfinals; 19 November
Baatarchuluuny Gantogtokh (MGL)	0
Nguyễn Trần Duy Nhất (VIE)	5
Yasin Ahmadi (IRI)	5
Yang Ming (CHN)	0
Niño Rio Saoy (PHI)
Mongkhon Artwichian (THA)	RET
Bhim Dal Rai (IND)
Nurym Kemal (KAZ)	KOB

Semifinals; 21 November
Nguyễn Trần Duy Nhất (VIE)	5
Yasin Ahmadi (IRI)	0
Mongkhon Artwichian (THA)
Nurym Kemal (KAZ)	RSCH

Final; 22 November
Nguyễn Trần Duy Nhất (VIE)	5
Nurym Kemal (KAZ)	0

==== 60 kg ====
Quarterfinals; 19 November		Semifinals; 21 November		Final; 22 November
Payam Malekmohammadi (IRI)	0
Chokchai Artwichian (THA)	5	Chokchai Artwichian (THA)	4
Nguyễn Doãn Long (VIE)	5	Nguyễn Doãn Long (VIE)	1
Kim Hun-jae (KOR)	0			Chokchai Artwichian (THA)	5
Alvin Berto (PHI)	3			Mirbek Sartkalmakov (KGZ)	0
Zhang Fang (CHN)	2	Alvin Berto (PHI)	0
Mirbek Sartkalmakov (KGZ)	5	Mirbek Sartkalmakov (KGZ)	5
Baýramguly Bagşyýew (TKM)	0

==== 63.5 kg ====
Round of 16; 18 November
Takhir Agishev (KAZ)
Mohd Amirul Ariffin (MAS)	RSCO
Tan Cher Han (SIN)
Võ Văn Đài (VIE)	RSCO
Ahmad Ondash (LIB)	5
Nurgeldi Ataýew (TKM)	0
Bobirjon Tagaev (UZB)	5
Ameer Ibrahim (IRQ)	0
Harish (IND)
Jonathan Polosan (PHI)	RSCO

Quarterfinals; 20 November
Chin Ngai Chung (HKG)	5
Enkh-Amaryn Batbayar (MGL)	0
Yuan Bing (CHN)	RSCH
Mohd Amirul Ariffin (MAS)
Võ Văn Đài (VIE)	5
Ahmad Ondash (LIB)	0
Bobirjon Tagaev (UZB)	5
Jonathan Polosan (PHI)	0

Semifinals; 21 November
Chin Ngai Chung (HKG)	0
Yuan Bing (CHN)	5
Võ Văn Đài (VIE)
Bobirjon Tagaev (UZB)	KOB

Final; 22 November
Yuan Bing (CHN)	1
Bobirjon Tagaev (UZB)	4

==== 67 kg ====
Round of 16; 18 November
Youssef Aboud (LIB)	KOH
Na Seung-il (KOR)

Quarterfinals; 20 November
Mustafa Saparmyradow (TKM)	2
Bekzhan Matysaev (KGZ)	3
Begidzhon Imomov (TJK)	0
Akram Hasan (IRQ)	5
Kaveh Soleimani (IRI)	5
Gu Hui (CHN)	0
Zhanserik Amirzhanov (KAZ)	4
Youssef Aboud (LIB)	1

Semifinals; 21 November
Bekzhan Matysaev (KGZ)	0
Akram Hasan (IRQ)	5
Kaveh Soleimani (IRI)	5
Zhanserik Amirzhanov (KAZ)	0

Final; 22 November
Akram Hasan (IRQ)	0
Kaveh Soleimani (IRI)	5

==== 71 kg ====
Round of 16; 18 November
Masoud Minaei (IRI)	KOH
Naimjon Tuhtaboev (UZB)
Pattanaphong Surichay (THA)	RSCO
Geng Haojun (CHN)

Quarterfinals; 19 November
Kunal Aravind Nargolkar (IND)
Rustem Akzhanov (KAZ)	RSCO
Mohammad Al-Halabi (SYR)	0
Mirbek Kachkynbaev (KGZ)	5
Jomi Latifov (TJK)	5
Muhammetberdi Rowşanow (TKM)	0
Masoud Minaei (IRI)	1
Pattanaphong Surichay (THA)	4

Semifinals; 21 November
Rustem Akzhanov (KAZ)	5
Mirbek Kachkynbaev (KGZ)	0
Jomi Latifov (TJK)
Pattanaphong Surichay (THA)	RET

Final; 22 November
Rustem Akzhanov (KAZ)	0
Pattanaphong Surichay (THA)	5

==== 75 kg ====
Quarterfinals; 18 November
Mansurbek Tolipov (UZB)	0
Hossein Karami (IRI)	5
Kamlesh Dewangan (IND)
Joel Zaspa (PHI)	KOB

Semifinals; 21 November
Vadim Loparev (KAZ)	5
Mohammad Salama (JOR)	0
Hossein Karami (IRI)	5
Joel Zaspa (PHI)	0

Final; 22 November
Vadim Loparev (KAZ)	3
Hossein Karami (IRI)	2

==== 81 kg ====
Round of 16; 18 November
Nooruzbek Sovetbekov (KGZ)
Mahmoud Sattari (IRI)	KOH

Quarterfinals; 20 November
Kamoljon Kazimov (UZB)	5
Mohammed Imad (IRQ)	0
Muhammadalijon Chakalov (TJK)
Asmaiel Btaih (SYR)	RSCO
Balakrishna Shekhar Shetty (IND)
Kassem El-Khatib (LIB)	RSCI
Mohammad Al-Barri (JOR)	0
Mahmoud Sattari (IRI)	5

Semifinals; 21 November
Kamoljon Kazimov (UZB)	RSCO
Asmaiel Btaih (SYR)
Kassem El-Khatib (LIB)
Mahmoud Sattari (IRI)	WO

Final; 22 November
Kamoljon Kazimov (UZB)	5
Mahmoud Sattari (IRI)	0

=== Women ===
==== 48 kg ====
Semifinals; 19 November		Final; 22 November
Nguyễn Thị Thanh Trúc (VIE)	5
Wu Hoi Yan (HKG)	0	Nguyễn Thị Thanh Trúc (VIE)	0
Rattanaphon Hanphan (THA)	RET	Rattanaphon Hanphan (THA)	5
Ayu Arynafaiza Azmi (MAS)

==== 51 kg ====
Quarterfinals; 18 November
Sarvinoz Rozibekova (TJK)
Yuan Anfei (CHN)	RSCB

Semifinals; 20 November
Bùi Thị Quỳnh (VIE)	0
Parita Padpho (THA)	5
Kim Min-ji (KOR)	5
Yuan Anfei (CHN)	0

Final; 22 November
Parita Padpho (THA)	CCL
Kim Min-ji (KOR)

==== 54 kg ====
Quarterfinals; 19 November
Sewara Ýakubowa (TKM)	0
Sergelenbayaryn Myadagmaa (MGL)	5
Wang Xiangjie (CHN)	0
Bùi Yến Ly (VIE)	5

Semifinals; 21 November
Germaine Yeap (MAS)	0
Sopapan Likittrakul (THA)	5
Sergelenbayaryn Myadagmaa (MGL)
Bùi Yến Ly (VIE)	RSCO

Final; 22 November
Sopapan Likittrakul (THA)	1
Bùi Yến Ly (VIE)	4

==== 57 kg ====
Quarterfinals; 18 November
Lena Tan (SIN)	0
Rima Sawah (LIB)	5
Rachadaporn Wihantamma (THA)	5
Salina Salleh (MAS)	0

Semifinals; 21 November
Nabat Batyrowa (TKM)
Atyaf Mahmood (IRQ)	RSCO
Rima Sawah (LIB)	0
Rachadaporn Wihantamma (THA)	5

Final; 22 November
Atyaf Mahmood (IRQ)
Rachadaporn Wihantamma (THA)	RSCB

==== 60 kg ====
Quarterfinals; 18 November
Bidhya Wati Rai (IND)	DSQ
Linda Hatem (IRQ)

Semifinals; 20 November
Nguyễn Thị Ngọc (VIE)	0
Kesinee Tabtrai (THA)	5
Rola Khaled (LIB)	5
Bidhya Wati Rai (IND)	0

Final; 22 November
Kesinee Tabtrai (THA)	5
Rola Khaled (LIB)	0
