= Pongsiri P.K.Saenchaimuaythaigym =

Thai Muay Thai kickboxer

Pongsiri P.K. Saenchai Muaythaigym
- Born: October 25, 1990 (age 35); Thailand
- Other names: Pongsiri Por Siripong (พงษ์ศิริ ป.ศิริพงษ์); Pongsiri Petch Por Tor Aor
- Nationality: Thai
- Height: 1.69 m (5 ft 6 1/2 in)
- Weight: 65.8 kg (145 lb; 10.36 st)
- Style: Muay Thai
- Stance: Orthodox
- Fighting out of: Bangkok, Thailand
- Team: P.K. Saenchai Muay Thai Gym

Kickboxing record
- Total: 209
- Wins: 159
- Losses: 39
- Draws: 11

Pongsiri P.K. Saenchai Muaythaigym (Thai: พงษ์ศิริ พี.เค.แสนชัยมวยไทยยิม), is a Thai Muay Thai kickboxer. He is four-time Muay Thai World Champion.

== Muay Thai career ==
He was scheduled to fight Phonaek Or Kwanmuang in the Prachinburi event in the Omnoi Stadium, in March 2020. The fight was for the Omnoi Stadium −147 lbs title. Pongsiri won by decision.

=== One Championship ===
He fought Phetmorakot Petchyindee Academy for the inaugural ONE Featherweight Muay Thai World Championship at ONE Championship: Warrior's Code on February 7, 2020. Phetmorakot won by unanimous decision.

He fought Sorgraw Petchyindee during ONE Championship: No Surrender 2 on August 14, 2020, and lost the bout by split decision.

Pongsiri was scheduled to fight Sean Clancy during ONE Championship: A New Breed 2 on September 11, 2020. Pongsiri won the fight by unanimous decision.

Pongsiri is scheduled to face Liam Harrison at ONE on TNT 2 on April 14, 2021. However, their fight was pulled from the event after the COVID-19 situation in the United Kingdom prevented Harrison from traveling.

Pongsiri faced former ONE Bantamweight Kickboxing World Champion Alaverdi Ramazanov at ONE Championship: NextGen 3 on November 26, 2021. He lost by first-round knockout.

Pongsiri was scheduled to face Liam Harrison on January 14, 2023, at ONE Fight Night 6. However, Harrison withdrew from the event due to injuries and requiring surgery. As a result, the bout was scrapped.

Pongsiri faced Ferzan Çiçek on January 27, 2023, at ONE Friday Fights 2. He won the fight via unanimous decision.

Pongsiri was scheduled to face Tyson Harrison on March 31, 2023, at ONE Friday Fights 11. However, Pongsiri withdraw from the bout due to injury and was replaced by Rambo Petch Por.Tor.Or.

== Titles and accomplishments ==
- Professional Boxing Association of Thailand (PAT)
  - 2007 Thailand 112 lbs Champion
- Lumpinee Stadium
  - 2007 Lumpinee Stadium 112 lbs Champion
  - 2016 Lumpinee Stadium 147 lbs Champion
- Channel 7 Stadium
  - 2016 Channel 7 Stadium 147 lbs Champion
- World Professional Muaythai Federation
  - 2017 WPMF World 154 lbs Champion
- Phoenix FC
  - 2018 Phoenix FC 154 lbs Champion
- Omnoi Stadium
  - 2020 Omnoi Stadium 147 lbs Champion

== Fight record ==
Muay Thai record
159 Wins, 40 Losses, 11 Draws
Date	Result	Opponent	Event	Location	Method	Round	Time
2024-07-05	Loss	(Myanmar) Soe Lin Oo	ONE Friday Fights 69, Lumpinee Stadium	Bangkok, Thailand	KO (Right Uppercut)	2	0:49
2023-09-29	Loss	(Russia) Kiamran Nabati	ONE Friday Fights 35	Bangkok, Thailand	Decision (Unanimous)	3	3:00
2023-07-18	Loss	(Iran) Fariyar Aminipour	ONE Friday Fights 29	Bangkok, Thailand	Decision (Unanimous)	3	3:00
2023-07-07	Win	(Portugal) Fabio Reis	ONE Friday Fights 24	Bangkok, Thailand	Decision (Majority)	3	3:00
2023-05-26	Win	(Australia) Tyson Harrison	ONE Friday Fights 18, Lumpinee Stadium	Bangkok, Thailand	Decision (Unanimous)	3	3:00
2023-01-27	Win	(Turkey) Ferzan Cicek	ONE Friday Fights 2, Lumpinee Stadium	Bangkok, Thailand	Decision (Unanimous)	3	3:00
2022-10-22	Loss	(Italy) Pasquale G.Amoroso	The King of the Ring 7	Cesinali, Italy	Decision	5	3:00
For the vacant WMO World Welterweight title
2022-07-08	Win	(Portugal) Fabio Reis	Muay Thai Fighter X	Pathum Thani, Thailand	Decision	5	3:00
2022-03-19	Win	(Iran) Mohammad Siasarani	Muay Thai Fighter X	Prachuap Khiri Khan, Thailand	Decision	5	3:00
2022-02-19	Loss	(Iran) Mohammad Siasarani	Muay Thai Fighter X	Prachuap Khiri Khan, Thailand	Decision	5	3:00
2021-11-26	Loss	(Russia) Alaverdi Ramazanov	ONE Championship: NextGen III	Kallang, Singapore	KO (Punch)	1	2:39
2020-11-29	Loss	(Thailand) Saemapetch Fairtex	Channel 7 Stadium	Bangkok, Thailand	KO	3	
2020-09-11	Win	(Republic of Ireland) Sean Clancy	ONE Championship: A New Breed 2	Bangkok, Thailand	Decision (Unanimous)	3	3:00
2020-08-14	Loss	(Thailand) Sorgraw Petchyindee	ONE Championship: No Surrender 2	Bangkok, Thailand	Decision (Split)	3	3:00
2020-03-07	Win	(Thailand) Phonek Or.Kwanmuang	SuekJaoMuayThai, Omnoi Stadium	Samut Sakhon, Thailand	Decision	5	3:00
Wins the vacant Omnoi Stadium 147 lbs title
2020-01-16	Win	(Thailand) Phonek Or.Kwanmuang	SuekJaoMuayThai, Omnoi Stadium	Samut Sakhon, Thailand	Decision	5	3:00
2020-02-07	Loss	(Thailand) Phetmorakot Petchyindee Academy	ONE Championship: Warrior's Code	Jakarta, Indonesia	Decision (Unanimous)	5	3:00
For the inaugural ONE Featherweight Muay Thai title
2019-12-24	Win	(Thailand) Singsuriya PornchaiPlazaRomKlao	Tded99, Lumpinee Stadium	Bangkok, Thailand	Decision	5	3:00
2019-11-07	Loss	(Thailand) Phonek Or.Kwanmuang	Ruamponkon Prachin	Prachinburi Province, Thailand	Decision	5	3:00
2019-07-30	Win	(Thailand) Singsuriya PornchaiPlazaRomKlao	PK Saenchai + SorJor.TongPrachin, Lumpinee Stadium	Bangkok, Thailand	Decision	5	3:00
2019-06-20	Win	(Thailand) Singsuriya PornchaiPlazaRomKlao	Sor.Sommai, Rajadamnern Stadium	Bangkok, Thailand	Decision	5	3:00
2019-04-12	Loss	(Cambodia) Meun Sophea	Bayon boxing	Cambodia	KO (Low Kicks)	2	2:45
2019-03-23	Draw	(Cambodia) Long Sophy	Seatv Kun Khmer	Cambodia	Decision	5	3:00
2019-03-17	Win	(Thailand) Avatar Tor.Morsri	Chang MuayThai Kiatpetch, OrTorGor.3 Stadium	Nonthaburi Province, Thailand	Decision	5	3:00
2019-02-11	Loss	(Japan) Kaito Ono	SHOOT BOXING 2019 act.1	Tokyo, Japan	Decision (Unanimous)	5	3:00
2018-12-23	Win	(Brazil) Marlon Santos	Topking World Series	Thailand	Decision	3	3:00
2018-10-28	Loss	(Australia) Chadd Collins	Topking World Series	Thailand	Decision	3	3:00
2018-10-05	Win	(Iran) Reza Ahmadnezhad	Muay Nai Khanom Tom – Muay Thai Expo	Buriram, Thailand	Decision	3	3:00
2018-08-29	Win	(Japan) Shinji Suzuki	Suk Wan Kingtong "Go to Raja"	Tokyo, Japan	Decision (Unanimous)	5	3:00
2018-07-15	Win	(Thailand) Avatar Tor.Morsri	MuayThaiJedsee, Channel 7 Stadium	Bangkok, Thailand	Decision	5	3:00
2018-05-22	Win	(France) Rafi Bohic	Phoenix 8, Lumpinee Stadium	Bangkok, Thailand	Decision	5	3:00
Wins the Phoenix FC −154 lbs belt.
2018-04-21	Win	(Italy) Cristian Marzullo	Thai Fight	Roma, Italy	KO (Right Elbow)	2	
2018-03-24	Win	(Spain) Victor Conesa	Thai Fight	Spain	TKO (Punches)	2	
2018-02-18	Loss	(Thailand) Manachai YokkaoMuayThai	MuayThaiJedsee, Channel 7 Stadium	Bangkok, Thailand	Decision	5	3:00
2017-12-16	Win	(Sweden) Samuel Bark	WPMF King's Birthday	Thailand	Decision	5	3:00
Wins WPMF World 154 lbs title.
2017-10-15	Loss	(England) Jordan Watson	Yokkao 28	Bolton, England	KO (Head Kick)	2	3:00
For the Yokkao −70kg title.
2017-09-30	Draw	(Sweden) Samuel Bark	Top King 16	Fujian, China	Decision	3	3:00
2017-09-10	Win	(France) Rafi Bohic	Lumpinee Stadium	Bangkok, Thailand	Decision	5	3:00
2017-08-05	Win	(Scotland) Craig Dickson	Top King 15	Thailand	Decision	3	3:00
2017-06-17	Loss	(France) Rafi Bohic	Lumpinee Stadium	Bangkok, Thailand	Decision	5	3:00
Loses the Lumpinee Stadium −147lbs belt.
2017-06-17	Loss	(Thailand) Nontakit Tor.Morsri	Kiatpetch + PKsaenchai promotion, Lumpinee Stadium	Bangkok, Thailand	Decision	5	3:00
2017-03-19	Loss	(Thailand) Nontakit Tor.Morsri	Channel 7 Stadium	Bangkok, Thailand	Decision	5	3:00
Lost the Channel 7 Stadium −147 lbs title.
2016-12-18	Win	(Thailand) Vinailek Sor.Jor.Vichitpadriew	Chiang Mai Boxing Stadium	Chiang Mai, Thailand	Decision	5	3:00
2016-10-07	Win	(France) Rafi Bohic	Lumpinee Stadium	Bangkok, Thailand	Decision	5	3:00
2016-09-02	Win	(France) Rafi Bohic	Lumpinee Stadium	Bangkok, Thailand	Decision	5	3:00
Wins Lumpinee Stadium −147 lbs belt.
2016-08-16	Win	(France) Valentin Thibaut	Fighting Man	China	Decision	5	3:00
2016-07-24	Win	(Thailand) Nontakit Tor.Morsri	Channel 7 Stadium	Bangkok, Thailand	Decision	5	3:00
2016-06-28	Win	(Thailand) Simanut Sor.Sarinya		Phang Nga Province, Thailand	Decision	5	3:00
2016-05-01	Loss	(Thailand) Simanut Sor.Sarinya	Jitmuangnon Stadium	Bangkok, Thailand	Decision	5	3:00
2016-03-20	Win	(Thailand) Simanut Sor.Sarinya	Channel 7 Stadium	Bangkok, Thailand	Decision	5	3:00
Wins the Channel 7 Stadium 147 lbs title.
2016-02-21	Win	(Thailand) Simanut Sor.Sarinya	Jitmuangnon Stadium	Bangkok, Thailand	Decision	5	3:00
2016-12-18	Loss	(Thailand) Vinailek Sor.Jor.Vichitpadriew		Buriram, Thailand	Decision	5	3:00
2015-12-20	Win	(Thailand) Vinailek Sor.Jor.Vichitpadriew	Jitmuangnon Stadium	Bangkok, Thailand	Decision	5	3:00
2015-11-08	Win	(Thailand) Phetmakok Sitdabmai	Channel 7 Stadium	Bangkok, Thailand	Decision	5	3:00
2015-08-15	Draw	(Thailand) Phetmakok Sitdabmai		Korat, Thailand	Decision	5	3:00
2015-07-19	Loss	(Cambodia) Bird Kham	SeaTV Khmer Thai Boxing	Cambodia	Decision	5	3:00
2014-10-05	Loss	(Thailand) Tuanpe TheBestUdon		Ubon Ratchathani province, Thailand	Decision	5	3:00
2014-09-06	Win	(Thailand) Rambo Por Tor.Or.Phan6	Daorung Wor.Wiwattananon	Surin, Thailand	Decision	5	3:00
2014-07-20	Loss	(Japan) Tsukuru Midorikawa	SNKA MAGNUM 35	Tokyo, Japan	Decision (Unanimous)	5	3:00
2013-07-12	Win	(Thailand) Kwanchai Phetniroj		Surin province, Thailand	Decision	5	3:00
2013-07-05	Win	(Thailand) Kamlaiphet Tor.Phran46		Surin province, Thailand	Decision	5	3:00
2013-10-13	Win	(Thailand) Kongprab Tdedlongoen		Surin province, Thailand	Decision	5	3:00
2012-09-20	Loss	(Thailand) Kongprab Tdedlongoen		Thailand	KO		
2012-04-26	Win	(Thailand) Rittewada Sitthikul		Thailand	Decision	5	3:00
2012-03-16	Win	(Thailand) Petchjing FA Group		Sukhothai province, Thailand	Decision	5	3:00
2012-01-30	Loss	(Thailand) Peiw Thanasuranakorn		Chaiyaphum province, Thailand	Decision	5	3:00
2011-07-10	Win	(Thailand) Komphet Thamaprang	MuayThai WMC	Thailand	Decision	5	3:00
2010-01-01	Win	(Thailand) Silpachai Sakulrattana	Petchyindee, Lumpinee Stadium	Bangkok, Thailand	Decision	5	3:00
2009-11-28	Win	(Thailand) Silpachai Sakulrattana	Omnoi Stadium	Samut Sakhon, Thailand	Decision	5	3:00
2009-10-07	Loss	(Thailand) Dechrit Sor Thanayong	Daorung, Rajadamnern Stadium	Bangkok, Thailand	Decision	5	3:00
2009-07-29	Loss	(Thailand) Fasathan Kor.Saphaothong	Kiatsingnoi, Rajadamnern Stadium	Bangkok, Thailand	KO	3	
2009-05-12	Loss	(Thailand) Dechrit Sor Thanayong	Lumpinee Stadium	Bangkok, Thailand	Decision	5	3:00
2009-03-05	Loss	(Thailand) Palangtip Kor Sapaothong	Lumpinee Stadium	Bangkok, Thailand	KO	5	
2009-02-07	Loss	(Thailand) Palangtip Kor Sapaothong	Lumpinee Stadium	Bangkok, Thailand	Decision	5	3:00
2009-01-10	Draw	(Thailand) Saenkeng Nopparat	Jao Muay Thai, Omnoi Stadium	Samut Sakhon, Thailand	Decision	5	3:00
2008-09-25	Loss	(Thailand) Wirayut Lukphetnoi	Rajadamnern Stadium	Bangkok, Thailand	Decision	5	3:00
2008-05-06	Win	(Thailand) Khunponjiew Saengsawangphantpla	Petchyindee, Lumpinee Stadium	Bangkok, Thailand	Decision	5	3:00
2008-03-28	Loss	(Thailand) Panomroonglek Kiatmoo9	Lumpinee Stadium	Thailand	Decision	5	3:00
For the vacant Lumpinee Stadium 115 lbs title.
2008-02-05	Win	(Thailand) Hokun Sitkruwat	Krikkrai, Lumpinee Stadium	Bangkok, Thailand	Decision	5	3:00
2007-12-07	Win	(Thailand) Norasing Lukbanyai	Lumpinee 51st Anniversary, Lumpinee Stadium	Bangkok, Thailand	Decision	5	3:00
Wins Lumpinee Stadium 112 lbs title.
2007-09-28	Win	(Thailand) Saeksan Or. Kwanmuang	Lumpinee Stadium	Bangkok, Thailand	Decision	5	3:00
Wins the Thailand 112 lbs title.
2007-06-22	Loss	(Thailand) Saeksan Or. Kwanmuang	Phetsupapan, Lumpinee Stadium	Bangkok, Thailand	Decision	5	3:00
2007-04-23	Loss	(Thailand) Saeksan Or. Kwanmuang	Sor Sommai, Rajadamnern Stadium	Bangkok, Thailand	Decision	5	3:00
2007-02-13	Win	(Thailand) Yodratchan Kiatbanphot	Petchpiya, Lumpinee Stadium	Bangkok, Thailand	Decision	5	3:00
2007-01-08		(Thailand) Hokun Sitkruwat	Lumpinee Stadium	Bangkok, Thailand			
2006-11-10	Loss	(Thailand) Nasilek Sor.Bonliang	Lumpinee Stadium	Bangkok, Thailand	Decision	5	3:00
2006-10-06	Win	(Thailand) Lekkla Thanasuranakorn	EminentAir, Lumpinee Stadium	Bangkok, Thailand	Decision	5	3:00
2006-08-04	Win	(Thailand) Petchboonchuay Borplaboonchu	Petchyindee, Lumpinee Stadium	Bangkok, Thailand	Decision	5	3:00
2006-06-08	Loss	(Thailand) Khaosod KilaAngthong	Daorung, Rajadamnern Stadium	Bangkok, Thailand	Decision	5	3:00
2006-05-05	Win	(Thailand) Yodpoj Sor.Skawarat	Lumpinee Stadium	Bangkok, Thailand	Decision	5	3:00
2006-03-09	Win	(Thailand) Krij KilaThungSong	Daorung, Rajadamnern Stadium	Bangkok, Thailand	Decision	5	3:00
2006-02-10	Loss	(Thailand) Burengnong Romsrithong	Fairtex, Lumpinee Stadium	Bangkok, Thailand	Decision	5	3:00
2006-01-10	Win	(Thailand) Burengnong Romsrithong	Daorung, Rajadamnern Stadium	Bangkok, Thailand	Decision	5	3:00
Legend: Win Loss Draw/No contest Notes

== Lethwei record ==
Lethwei record
0 Wins, 0 Loss, 1 Draw
Date	Result	Opponent	Event	Location	Method	Round	Time
2020-01-19	Draw	(Myanmar) Soe Lin Oo	Win Sein Taw Ya 2020	Mudon Township, Myanmar	Draw	5	3:00
Legend: Win Loss Draw/No contest Notes
