= Buakiew Sitsongpeenong =

Thai Muay Thai kickboxer

- Born: October 23, 1993 (age 32); Khon Kaen province, Thailand
- Other names: Buakiew Por.Pongsawang (บัวเขียว ป.พงษ์สว่าง)
- Nationality: Thai
- Height: 1.82 m (5 ft 11 1/2 in)
- Weight: 67 kg (148 lb; 10.6 st)
- Style: Muay Thai
- Stance: Orthodox
- Fighting out of: Bangkok, Thailand
- Team: Sitsongpeenong (2017-Present) Por.Pongsawang

Buakiew Sitsongpeenong (Thai: บัวเขียว ศิษย์สองพี่น้อง), is a Thai Muay Thai fighter. He is a former Lumpinee Stadium Super-welterweight (154 lb) Champion of Thai kickboxing.

== Career ==
On March 18, 2017 Buakiew faced Nattakiat Phran26 at the Omnoi Stadium as part of the Isuzu Cup. He lost the fight by knockout in the fourth round.

On June 2, 2017 Buakiew faced Aroondej M16 at the Lumpinee Stadium. He lost the fight by decision.

On July 28, 2017 Buakiew faced Julio Lobo for the vacant WPMF World 147 lbs title. He won the fight by decision.

On September 1, 2017 Buakiew faced Fahsura Windy Sport for the vacant Lumpinee Stadium 154 lbs title. He won the fight by decision.

On November 30, 2017 Buakiew faced Sibmuen Sitchefboontham at the Omnoi Stadium. He won the fight by decision.

On February 27, 2017 Buakiew faced Bobo Sacko for the vacant WBC Muaythai World 147 lbs title. He won the fight by technical knockout with a body kick in the fourth round.

On April 1, 2018 Buakiew took part in the Real Hero 8-man one night tournament. In quarter finals he defeated Pavel Grishanovich by decision before losing to Bobirjon Tagaev by decision in the semi-finals.

On September 19, 2018 Buakiew faced Sibmuen Sitchefboontham at Rajadamnern Stadium. He won the fight by knockout with knees to the body in round 4.

== Titles and accomplishments ==
- Lumpinee Stadium
  - 2017 Lumpinee Stadium Super-welterweight (154 lb) Champion
- World Boxing Council
  - 2018 WBC Muay Thai World Welterweight Champion
- World Profesional Muaythai Federation
  - 2017 WPMF World Welterweight Champion

== Muay Thai record ==
Muay Thai record
Date	Result	Opponent	Event	Location	Method	Round	Time
2019-11-17	Loss	(Brazil) Victor Almeida	Muay Thai Super Champ	Bangkok, Thailand	Decision	3	3:00
2019-03-17	Loss	(Thailand) Singmanee Kaewsamrit	Miracle Muay Thai Festival, Final	Phra Nakhon Si Ayutthaya, Thailand	KO	1	
2019-03-17	Win	(Algeria) Abderrezzaq Djaadane	Miracle Muay Thai Festival, Semi-final	Phra Nakhon Si Ayutthaya, Thailand	Decision	3	3:00
2019-01-10	Loss	(Thailand) Sakmongkol Sor.Sommai	Sor.Sommai, Rajadamnern Stadium	Bangkok, Thailand	KO (Left Elbow)	3	
2018-12-15	Loss	(Cambodia) Em Lengly	Kun Khmer SEA TV	Cambodia	TKO (Doctor stoppage)	2	1:10
2018-11-25	Draw	(Cambodia) Meun Sophea	Khmer Warrior Bayon TV	Cambodia	Decision	5	3:00
2018-09-19	Loss	(Thailand) Sibmuen Sitchefboontham	Rajadamnern Stadium	Bangkok, Thailand	KO (Knees)	4	
2018-07-27	Loss	(Cambodia) Vong Noy	Khmer Warrior Bayon TV	Cambodia	KO (Elbow)	2	1:10
2018-07-15	Win	(Algeria) Walid Otamne	Muay Thai Super Champ	Bangkok, Thailand	Decision	3	3:00
2018-04-01	Loss	(Uzbekistan) Bobirjon Tagaev	Real Hero, Tournament Semi-final	Bangkok, Thailand	Decision	1	5:00
2018-04-01	Win	(Belarus) Pavel Grishanovich	Real Hero, Tournament Quarter-final	Bangkok, Thailand	Decision	1	5:00
2018-02-27	Win	(France) Bobo Sacko	Best Of Siam XII, Lumpinee Stadium	Bangkok, Thailand	TKO (Body kick)	4	
Wns the vacant WBC Muay Thai World Welterweight title.
2018-01-17	Loss	(Thailand) Sibmuen Sitchefboontham	Rajadamnern Stadium	Bangkok, Thailand	KO (Left Elbow)	3	
2017-11-30	Win	(Thailand) Sibmuen Sitchefboontham	Rajadamnern Stadium	Bangkok, Thailand	Decision	5	3:00
2017-09-30	Win	(Ukraine) Sasha Moisa	All Star Fight 2	Bangkok, Thailand	Decision	3	3:00
2017-09-01	Win	(Thailand) Fahsura WindySport	Lumpinee Stadium	Bangkok, Thailand	Decision	5	3:00
Wns the vacant Lumpinee Stadium Super-welterweight (154 lb) title.
2017-07-28	Win	(Brazil) Julio Lobo	King's Birthday	Thailand	Decision	5	3:00
Wins the vacant WPMF World 147 lbs title.
2017-06-02	Loss	(Thailand) Aroondej M16	Lumpinee Stadium	Bangkok, Thailand	Decision	5	3:00
2017-03-18	Loss	(Thailand) Nattakiat Phran26	Omnoi Stadium - Isuzu Cup	Samut Sakhon, Thailand	KO (Left cross)	4	
2017-01-28	Win	(Thailand) Phetwanlop Sitsongpeenong	Omnoi Stadium - Isuzu Cup	Samut Sakhon, Thailand	KO	2	
2016-11-19	Loss	(Thailand) Duangsompong Nayok A Tasala	Omnoi Stadium - Isuzu Cup	Samut Sakhon, Thailand	Decision	5	3:00
2016-09-17	Win	(Thailand) Phetwanlop Sitsongpeenong	Omnoi Stadium - Isuzu Cup	Samut Sakhon, Thailand	Decision	5	3:00
2016-08-27	Win	(Thailand) Saenphet Kiatphetnoi	Omnoi Stadium	Samut Sakhon, Thailand	Decision	5	3:00
2016-07-16	Loss	(Thailand) Suayngarm Pumphanmuang	Omnoi Stadium	Samut Sakhon, Thailand	Decision	5	3:00
2016-04-17	Win	(Slovakia) Vladimir Konsky	Super Muay Thai	Bangkok, Thailand	Decision	3	3:00
2016-03-13	Win	(France) Sliman Zegnoun	Super Muay Thai	Bangkok, Thailand	Decision	3	3:00
2015-05-12	Loss	(Sweden) Tobias Alexandersson	Super Muay Thai	Bangkok, Thailand	Decision	3	3:00
Legend: Win Loss Draw/No contest Notes
