= Mohammad Siasarani =

Iranian Muay Thai Kickboxer

- Born: Mohammad Siasarani Kojouri; May 27, 2002 (age 24); Tehran, Iran
- Other names: Mohammad Venum MuayThai
- Height: 5 ft 10 in (178 cm)
- Weight: 152 lb (69 kg; 10 st 12 lb)
- Division: Lightweight
- Style: Muay Thai, Kickboxing
- Fighting out of: Chonburi, Thailand
- Team: Venum Training Camp
- Trainer: Mehdi Zatout
- Years active: 2017-present

Kickboxing record
- Total: 42
- Wins: 28
- By knockout: 12
- Losses: 14
- By knockout: 3
- Draws: 0

Mohammad Siasarani (Persian: محمد سیاسرانی; born May 27, 2002) is an Iranian Muay Thai kickboxer who competes in the Featherweight division of ONE Championship. As of September 22, 2026, he is ranked #3 in the ONE Featherweight Muay Thai rankings.

As of December 2025 he was the #5 ranked -71 kg kickboxer in the world according to Beyond Kickboxing.

== Career ==
=== Thai Fight ===
On August 24, 2019, Siasarani lost to Por Tor Thor Petchrungruang at THAI FIGHT Kham Chanod, by KO in the first round.

=== WBC Muay Thai ===
On October 4, 2019, Siasarani challenged Phetmorakot Petchyindee Academy for the WBC Muaythai diamond Middleweight World title.

=== Muay Thai Fighter X ===
On February 19, 2022, Siasarani lost to Pongsiri P.K.Saenchaimuaythaigym by decision at Muay Thai Fighter X.

Siasarani was scheduled to rematch Pongsiri P.K.Saenchaimuaythaigym at Muay Thai Fighter X on March 19, 2022. He won the fight by decision.

=== Rajadamnern World Series ===
On August 19, 2022, Siasarani made his Rajadamnern World Series Muay Thai debut at Rajadamnern Stadium, where he lost to Thananchai Rachanon by decision.

Siasarani was scheduled to rematch Thananchai Rachanon at RWS Muay Thai on October 28, 2022. He lost the fight by technical knockout.

=== ONE Championship ===
On January 27, 2023, Siasarani made his ONE Championship debut at ONE Friday Fights 2, where he defeated Avatar Tor.Morsri by unanimous decision.

On May 26, 2023, Siasarani made him second ONE apparition at ONE Friday Fights 18, where he defeated Mohammed Boutasaa by unanimous decision after scoring a knockdown.

On July 21, 2023, Siasarani made his third ONE Championship apparition at ONE Friday Fights 26, where he defeated Satanfah Sitsongpeenong by KO in the first round.

On September 8, 2023, Siasarani made him fourth ONE apparition at ONE Friday Fights 32, where he defeated Sitthichai Sitsongpeenong by unanimous decision after scoring a knockdown.

Siasarani faced Liu Mengyang at ONE Friday Fights 105 on April 18, 2025. He won the fight by split decision.

Siasarani faced Kaito at ONE Friday Fights 109 on May 23, 2025. He won the fight by unanimous decision.

On December 19, 2025, Siasarani faced Jo Nattawut at ONE Friday Fights 137. He won the fight by second-round knockout. Following this victory Siasarani was offered a $100,000 ONE Championship contract.

== Titles and accomplishments ==
=== Professional ===
- World Boxing Council Muay Thai
  - 2024 WBC Muay Thai World Super-welterweight (154 lb) Champion

=== Amateur ===
- World Muaythai Federation
  - 2019 WMF World Championship 67 kg (gold)

== Fight record ==
Muay Thai & Kickboxing record
28 Wins (12 (T)KO's), 14 Losses, 0 Draw
| Date | Result | Opponent | Event | Location | Method | Round | Time |
| 2026-12-02 | | (Japan) Hiromi Wajima | ONE Samurai 6 | Yokohama, Japan | | | |
| 2026-10-17 | Loss | (Japan) Masaaki Noiri | ONE Samurai 4 | Tokyo, Japan | Decision (split) | 3 | 3:00 |
ONE Samurai Featherweight Kickboxing Tournament Semifinal.
| 2026-08-08 | Win | (Japan) Kaito Ono | ONE Samurai 2 | Tokyo, Japan | KO (High kick) | 1 | 1:47 |
ONE Samurai Featherweight Kickboxing Tournament Quarterfinal.
| 2026-01-24 | Win | (Brazil) João Pedro Dantas | ONE Fight Night 39 | Bangkok, Thailand | Decision (Unanimous) | 3 | 3:00 |
| 2025-12-19 | Win | (Thailand) Jo Nattawut | ONE Friday Fights 137, Lumpinee Stadium | Bangkok, Thailand | KO (Right cross) | 2 | 1:39 |
| 2025-08-29 | Win | (Poland) Oskar Siegert | ONE Friday Fights 122, Lumpinee Stadium | Bangkok, Thailand | Décision (Unanimous) | 3 | 3:00 |
| 2025-05-23 | Win | (Japan) Kaito Ono | ONE Friday Fights 109, Lumpinee Stadium | Bangkok, Thailand | Decision (Unanimous) | 3 | 3:00 |
| 2025-04-18 | Win | (China) Liu Mengyang | ONE Friday Fights 105, Lumpinee Stadium | Bangkok, Thailand | Decision (Split) | 3 | 3:00 |
| 2024-11-29 | Loss | (Thailand) Khunsuek SuperbonTrainingCamp | ONE Friday Fights 89, Lumpinee Stadium | Bangkok, Thailand | Decision (Unanimous) | 3 | 3:00 |
| 2024-09-27 | Loss | (Thailand) Shadow Singmawynn | ONE Friday Fights 81, Lumpinee Stadium | Bangkok, Thailand | Decision (Unanimous) | 3 | 3:00 |
| 2024-04-23 | Win | (Thailand) Sornkhaw Sitkamnanlue | Venum Fight, Rajadamnern Stadium | Bangkok, Thailand | Decision (Split) | 5 | 3:00 |
Wins the vacant WBC Muay Thai World Super-welterweight (154 lb) title.
| 2023-11-18 | Loss | (Belgium) Youssef Challouki | La Nuit Des Champions 30 | Marseille, France | Decision (Unanimous) | 5 | 3:00 |
For La Nuit des Champions Light Middleweight (-71kg) title.
| 2023-09-08 | Win | (Thailand) Sitthichai Sitsongpeenong | ONE Friday Fights 32, Lumpinee Stadium | Bangkok, Thailand | Decision (Unanimous) | 3 | 3:00 |
| 2023-08-12 | Loss | (Thailand) Kongthailand Kiatnavy | Rebellion Muaythai XXIX - 8-man Tournament, Quarterfinals | Melbourne, Australia | Decision | 3 | 3:00 |
| 2023-07-21 | Win | (Thailand) Satanfah Sitsongpeenong | ONE Friday Fights 26, Lumpinee Stadium | Bangkok, Thailand | KO (Punches) | 1 | 2:26 |
| 2023-05-26 | Win | (Morocco) Mohammed Boutasaa | ONE Friday Fights 18, Lumpinee Stadium | Bangkok, Thailand | Decision (Unanimous) | 3 | 3:00 |
| 2023-01-27 | Win | (Thailand) Avatar Tor.Morsri | ONE Friday Fights 2, Lumpinee Stadium | Bangkok, Thailand | Decision (Majority) | 3 | 3:00 |
| 2022-10-28 | Loss | (Thailand) Thananchai Rachanon | Rajadamnern World Series | Bangkok, Thailand | KO (Knee to the body) | 2 | 1:35 |
| 2022-08-19 | Loss | (Thailand) Thananchai Rachanon | Rajadamnern World Series | Bangkok, Thailand | Decision (Unanimous) | 3 | 3:00 |
| 2022-04-09 | Win | (Thailand) Kamlaiphet AyothayaFightGym | Muay Hardcore | Bangkok, Thailand | Decision | 3 | 3:00 |
| 2022-03-19 | Loss | (Thailand) Pongsiri P.K.Saenchaimuaythaigym | Muay Thai Fighter X | Prachuap Khiri Khan, Thailand | Decision | 5 | 3:00 |
| 2022-02-19 | Win | (Thailand) Pongsiri P.K.Saenchaimuaythaigym | Muay Thai Fighter X | Prachuap Khiri Khan, Thailand | Decision | 5 | 3:00 |
| 2021-12-05 | Loss | (Thailand) Rambo J.PowerRoofSamui | Muay Thai Super Champ | Bangkok, Thailand | Decision | 3 | 3:00 |
| 2021-11-13 | Win | (Thailand) Saensiri JPowerRoofPhuket | Muay Hardcore | Bangkok, Thailand | Decision | 3 | 3:00 |
| 2021-10-16 | Win | (Thailand) Nawamin Tor Buamat | Muay Hardcore | Bangkok, Thailand | KO (Punches) | 1 | 2:45 |
| 2021-03-13 | Win | (Thailand) Nawamin Tor Buamat | Muay Hardcore | Bangkok, Thailand | KO | 2 | 1:05 |
| 2020-02-16 | Loss | (Thailand) Sarigadong Por Pongsawang | Muay Thai Super Champ | Bangkok, Thailand | Decision | 3 | 3:00 |
| 2020-01-12 | Loss | (Thailand) Sarigadong Por Pongsawang | Muay Thai Super Champ | Bangkok, Thailand | Decision | 3 | 3:00 |
| 2019-12-14 | Loss | (Thailand) Beckham Singpatong | Muay Hardcore | Bangkok, Thailand | Decision | 3 | 3:00 |
| 2019-11-15 | Win | (Hong Kong) Mai Tianyu | Macau Fight 2019 | Macau | Decision (Unanimous) | 3 | 3:00 |
| 2019-10-04 | Loss | (Thailand) Petchmorakot Petchyindee Academy | Hilux Revo Muay Thai Marathon | Chiang Rai, Thailand | KO (Knee to Body) | 2 | |
For WBC Muay Thai Diamond Middleweight title
| 2019-08-24 | Loss | (Thailand) Por Tor Thor Petchrungruang | THAI FIGHT Kham Chanod | Udon Thani, Thailand | TKO (Punches & knees) | 1 | |
Legend: Win Loss Draw/No contest Notes

== See also ==
- List of current ONE fighters
- List of WBC Muaythai diamond champions
