= ONE Friday Fights 2 =

Combat sport events in 2023

ONE Friday Fights 2: Sangmanee vs. Kulabdam 2
- The poster for ONE Friday Fights 2: Sangmanee vs. Kulabdam 2
- Promotion: ONE Championship
- Date: January 27, 2023
- Venue: Lumpinee Boxing Stadium
- City: Bangkok, Thailand

Event chronology
ONE Friday Fights 1: Nong-O vs. Ramazanov	ONE Friday Fights 2: Sangmanee vs. Kulabdam 2	ONE Friday Fights 3: Chorfah vs. Petsukumvit

ONE Friday Fights 2: Sangmanee vs. Kulabdam 2 (also known as ONE Lumpinee 2) was a combat sport event produced by ONE Championship that took place on January 27, 2023, at Lumpinee Boxing Stadium in Bangkok, Thailand.

== Background ==
A bantamweight muay thai rematch between "The Million Dollar Baby" Sangmanee P.K.Saenchai and Kulabdam Sor.Jor.Piek-U-Thai headlined the event. They met previously in a bantamweight muay thai tournament at ONE: No Surrender 3 on July 31, 2020, where Kulabdam won by first-round knockout.

At the weigh-ins, the bantamweight muay thai bout between Pongsiri P.K.Saenchai and Ferzan Cicek was moved to a catchweight of 152 pounds due to the pair failed to make weight in the bantamweight division; Thai-Ngan Le weighed in at 119 pounds, 4 pounds over the atomweight limit. The bout proceeded at catchweight with Le was fined their purse of his purse, which went to his opponent Marie Ruumet.

== Results ==
Main Card (YouTube / Watch ONE)
Weight class				Method	Round	Time	Notes
Bantamweight Muay Thai	Kulabdam Sor.Jor.Piek-U-Thai	def.	Sangmanee P.K.Saenchai	Decision (unanimous)	3	3:00
Strawweight Muay Thai	Chalamkhao P.K.Saenchai	def.	Petchthong Kiatsongrit	Decision (unanimous)	3	3:00
Featherweight Muay Thai	Mohammad Siasarani	def.	Avatar P.K.Saenchai	Decision (majority)	3	3:00
Flyweight Muay Thai	Nakrob Fairtex	def.	Sherzod Kabutov	Decision (unanimous)	3	3:00
Atomweight Muay Thai	Songchainoi Kiatsongrit	def.	Yoddoi Kaewsamrit	Decision (unanimous)	3	3:00
Preliminary card (FanDuel TV)
Catchweight (140 lbs) Muay Thai	Yodlekpet Or. Atchariya	def.	Silviu Vitez	TKO (doctor stoppage)	2	2:08
Catchweight (152 lbs) Muay Thai	Pongsiri P.K.Saenchai	def.	Ferzan Çiçek	Decision (unanimous)	3	3:00
Middleweight	Arash Mardani	def.	Harry Grech	DQ (inactivity)	3	3:20	(Note: The bout was ended by disqualification due to the referee giving Grech a red card for inactivity.)
Flyweight Muay Thai	Elias Ghazali	def.	Ayad Albadr	Decision (unanimous)	3	3:00
Catchweight (119 lbs) Muay Thai	Marie Ruumet	def.	Thai-Ngan Le	Decision (unanimous)	3	3:00
Bantamweight	Jakub Wayman	def.	Riccardo Cantindig-Stagg	TKO (punches)	3	4:21

== Bonus awards ==
The following fighters received $10,000 bonuses.

- Performance of the Night: Yodlekpet Or. Atchariya

== See also ==
- 2023 in ONE Championship
- List of ONE Championship events
- List of current ONE fighters
