= Tent pegging at the 2010 Asian Beach Games =

- Venue: Barkah Equestrian Grounds
- Dates: 9–13 December 2010

Tent pegging at the 2010 Asian Beach Games was held from 9 December to 13 December 2010 in Barkah Equestrian Grounds, Muscat, Oman.

== Medalists ==
Event	Gold	Silver	Bronze
Individual lance	Ali Bannon; Iraq	Shahbaz Qamar; Pakistan	Amer Munawar; Pakistan
Team lance	Oman; Hilal Al-Balushi; Ali Saleh Al-Balushi; Ali Khamis Al-Balushi; Nasser Al-Siyabi	Pakistan; Amer Munawar; Qamar-uz-Zaman Khan; Shahbaz Qamar; Haroon Bandial	Yemen; Mohammed Al-Ghamli; Jalal Al-Yousefi; Hamza Al-Dhobhani; Jamal Al-Tawil
Individual sword	HC Jaswinder Singh; India	Mohammed Shaya; Iraq	Hamza Al-Dhobhani; Yemen
Team sword	Oman; Hilal Al-Balushi; Ali Saleh Al-Balushi; Yousuf Al-Mamari; Nasser Al-Siyabi	Iraq; Mohammed Shaya; Osama Liwa; Ali Bannon; Abdul-Khaleq Ayad	Jordan; Riyad Al-Shoura; Ayed Namran; Husam Al-Khazaleh; Jehad Al-Aqrabawi
Rings & pegs	Ali Saleh Al-Balushi; Oman	Mohammed Shaya; Iraq	Insp. Jaswinder Singh; India
Lemons & pegs	Nasser Al-Siyabi; Oman	Ayed Namran; Jordan	Osama Liwa; Iraq
Pairs file	Iraq; Mohammed Shaya; Ali Bannon	Jordan; Ayed Namran; Husam Al-Khazaleh	Oman; Hilal Al-Balushi; Ali Saleh Al-Balushi
Indian file	Iraq; Osama Liwa; Abdul-Khaleq Ayad; Ali Bannon; Mohammed Shaya	Yemen; Mohammed Al-Ghamli; Jalal Al-Yousefi; Hamza Al-Dhobhani; Jamal Al-Tawil	Oman; Ali Saleh Al-Balushi; Yousuf Al-Mamari; Nasser Al-Siyabi; Hilal Al-Balushi

== Medal table ==
Rank	Nation	Gold	Silver	Bronze	Total
1	Oman (OMA)	4	0	2	6
2	Iraq (IRQ)	3	3	1	7
3	India (IND)	1	0	1	2
4	Jordan (JOR)	0	2	1	3
4	Pakistan (PAK)	0	2	1	3
6	Yemen (YEM)	0	1	2	3
Totals (6 entries)		8	8	8	24

== Results ==
=== Individual lance ===
9 December

Rank	Athlete	Round A			Round B			Total	Tie-off
Rank	Athlete	Run 1	Run 2	Run 3	Run 1	Run 2	Run 3	Total	Tie-off
1st place, gold medalist(s)	Ali Bannon (IRQ)	6.0	6.0	6.0	6.0	6.0	6.0	36.0	6.59
2nd place, silver medalist(s)	Shahbaz Qamar (PAK)	6.0	6.0	6.0	6.0	6.0	6.0	36.0	7.25
3rd place, bronze medalist(s)	Amer Munawar (PAK)	6.0	6.0	6.0	6.0	6.0	4.0	34.0	
4	Ali Khamis Al-Balushi (OMA)	6.0	6.0	6.0	6.0	2.0	6.0	32.0	
5	Ali Saleh Al-Balushi (OMA)	6.0	6.0	4.0	6.0	2.0	6.0	30.0	
5	Nasser Al-Siyabi (OMA)	6.0	6.0	6.0	6.0	2.0	4.0	30.0	
7	Osama Liwa (IRQ)	4.0	3.5	5.5	6.0	6.0	4.0	29.0	
8	Mohammed Shaya (IRQ)	6.0	6.0	4.0	6.0	6.0	0.0	28.0	
8	Hilal Al-Balushi (OMA)	6.0	2.0	4.0	6.0	4.0	6.0	28.0	
8	Krishan Yadav (IND)	6.0	6.0	6.0	2.0	6.0	2.0	28.0	
8	Haroon Bandial (PAK)	6.0	6.0	4.0	2.0	6.0	4.0	28.0	
12	Riyad Al-Shoura (JOR)	5.5	6.0	0.0	6.0	6.0	4.0	27.5	
13	Husam Al-Khazaleh (JOR)	5.5	6.0	5.5	6.0	0.0	4.0	27.0	
14	Hamza Al-Dhobhani (YEM)	6.0	6.0	4.0	0.0	6.0	4.0	26.0	
14	Ayed Namran (JOR)	6.0	4.0	6.0	6.0	4.0	0.0	26.0	
14	Insp. Jaswinder Singh (IND)	6.0	6.0	6.0	4.0	4.0	0.0	26.0	
17	Mahmood Firas Al-Masri (SYR)	3.5	6.0	6.0	4.0	6.0	0.0	25.5	
17	Mahmood Ayad (IRQ)	6.0	6.0	6.0	0.0	6.0	1.5	25.5	
19	Jamal Al-Tawil (YEM)	3.5	6.0	0.0	6.0	6.0	2.0	23.5	
20	Mohammed Al-Ghamli (YEM)	4.0	6.0	6.0	6.0	0.0	0.0	22.0	
20	Awad Abuenen (SYR)	6.0	4.0	3.5	5.5	1.5	1.5	22.0	
20	Mohamed Afdhal (BRN)	4.0	6.0	0.0	6.0	6.0	0.0	22.0	
20	Qamar-uz-Zaman Khan (PAK)	6.0	6.0	0.0	6.0	4.0	0.0	22.0	
24	Jalal Al-Yousefi (YEM)	0.0	4.0	2.0	6.0	6.0	2.0	20.0	
24	Khalid Jasim (BRN)	6.0	4.0	0.0	6.0	4.0	0.0	20.0	
24	Sunder Singh (IND)	6.0	0.0	4.0	6.0	4.0	0.0	20.0	
27	Heidar Balloul (SYR)	2.0	2.0	0.0	4.0	6.0	4.0	18.0	
27	Jehad Al-Aqrabawi (JOR)	0.0	0.0	4.0	6.0	4.0	4.0	18.0	
29	HC Jaswinder Singh (IND)	6.0	0.0	0.0	6.0	1.5	0.0	13.5	
30	Oleg Chernov (KAZ)	0.0	6.0	0.0	0.0	0.0	6.0	12.0	
31	Mohamed Khlef (BRN)	3.5	0.0	3.5	0.0	0.0	1.5	8.5	
32	Heider Mohamed (BRN)	0.0	0.0	6.0	0.0	0.0	2.0	8.0	
33	Natalya Dolgikh (KAZ)	0.0	0.0	0.0	0.0	0.0	6.0	6.0	
34	Mohammad Hamza (SYR)	0.0	0.0	0.0	0.0	0.0	0.0	0.0	

=== Team lance ===
12 December

Rank	Team	Round A			Round B			Total
Rank	Team	Run 1	Run 2	Run 3	Run 1	Run 2	Run 3	Total
1st place, gold medalist(s)	Oman (OMA)	24.0	24.0	8.0	20.0	22.0	22.0	120.00
2nd place, silver medalist(s)	Pakistan (PAK)	24.0	22.0	16.0	22.0	22.0	6.0	112.00
3rd place, bronze medalist(s)	Yemen (YEM)	22.0	23.5	16.0	23.5	12.0	14.0	111.00
4	Iraq (IRQ)	16.0	18.0	14.0	18.0	14.0	18.0	98.0
5	Jordan (JOR)	12.0	20.0	14.0	14.0	16.0	12.0	88.0
6	Bahrain (BRN)	12.0	14.0	18.0	17.5	5.5	6.0	73.0
7	India (IND)	12.0	18.0	11.5	21.5	0.0	8.0	71.0
8	Syria (SYR)	7.0	10.0	4.0	18.0	8.0	10.0	57.0

=== Individual sword ===
10 December

Rank	Athlete	Round A			Round B			Total	Time
Rank	Athlete	Run 1	Run 2	Run 3	Run 1	Run 2	Run 3	Total	Time
1st place, gold medalist(s)	HC Jaswinder Singh (IND)	6.0	6.0	6.0	6.0	6.0	2.0	32.0	
2nd place, silver medalist(s)	Mohammed Shaya (IRQ)	6.0	6.0	0.0	6.0	6.0	6.0	30.0	6.99
3rd place, bronze medalist(s)	Hamza Al-Dhobhani (YEM)	6.0	6.0	6.0	0.0	6.0	6.0	30.0	7.04
4	Hilal Al-Balushi (OMA)	6.0	6.0	0.0	6.0	6.0	6.0	30.0	7.23
5	Osama Liwa (IRQ)	6.0	6.0	6.0	6.0	6.0	EL	30.0	
6	Qamar-uz-Zaman Khan (PAK)	6.0	6.0	5.5	0.0	6.0	6.0	29.5	
7	Ali Saleh Al-Balushi (OMA)	2.0	6.0	6.0	6.0	2.0	6.0	28.0	
8	Ayed Namran (JOR)	6.0	6.0	6.0	5.5	0.0	4.0	27.5	
9	Krishan Yadav (IND)	6.0	6.0	6.0	6.0	0.0	2.0	26.0	6.68
10	Shahbaz Qamar (PAK)	6.0	6.0	2.0	6.0	6.0	0.0	26.0	7.23
11	Nasser Al-Siyabi (OMA)	6.0	5.5	1.5	0.0	5.5	6.0	24.5	
12	Jamal Al-Tawil (YEM)	6.0	6.0	2.0	2.0	6.0	0.0	22.0	7.10
13	Ali Khamis Al-Balushi (OMA)	6.0	4.0	0.0	6.0	0.0	6.0	22.0	7.50
14	Ali Bannon (IRQ)	6.0	6.0	0.0	4.0	4.0	0.0	20.0	6.56
15	Insp. Jaswinder Singh (IND)	6.0	6.0	0.0	2.0	6.0	0.0	20.0	6.95
16	Haroon Bandial (PAK)	0.0	6.0	6.0	6.0	0.0	2.0	20.0	7.15
17	Sunder Singh (IND)	2.0	0.0	6.0	6.0	0.0	6.0	20.0	7.21
18	Suleman Hussen (BRN)	3.5	6.0	0.0	6.0	4.0	0.0	19.5	7.36
19	Mahmood Ayad (IRQ)	2.0	6.0	0.0	5.5	6.0	0.0	19.5	7.50
20	Jalal Al-Yousefi (YEM)	4.0	0.0	6.0	2.0	6.0	0.0	18.0	6.75
21	Jehad Al-Aqrabawi (JOR)	6.0	6.0	2.0	0.0	0.0	4.0	18.0	6.82
22	Mohamed Khlef (BRN)	6.0	0.0	0.0	6.0	6.0	0.0	18.0	7.20
23	Mohamed Afdhal (BRN)	6.0	6.0	0.0	6.0	0.0	0.0	18.0	7.26
24	Oleg Chernov (KAZ)	0.0	5.5	0.0	5.5	6.0	0.0	17.0	
25	Mohammad Hamza (SYR)	6.0	6.0	0.0	0.0	0.0	4.0	16.0	
26	Khalid Jasim (BRN)	0.0	5.5	0.0	0.0	6.0	4.0	15.5	
27	Mohammed Al-Ghamli (YEM)	2.0	6.0	0.0	0.0	6.0	0.0	14.0	
28	Heidar Balloul (SYR)	0.0	6.0	4.0	2.0	0.0	0.0	12.0	7.21
29	Husam Al-Khazaleh (JOR)	0.0	6.0	0.0	6.0	0.0	0.0	12.0	7.50
30	Riyad Al-Shoura (JOR)	0.0	6.0	0.0	0.0	0.0	2.0	8.0	
31	Mahmood Firas Al-Masri (SYR)	3.5	0.0	0.0	0.0	0.0	4.0	7.5	
32	Natalya Dolgikh (KAZ)	0.0	0.0	0.0	6.0	0.0	0.0	6.0	6.61
33	Amer Munawar (PAK)	0.0	0.0	0.0	6.0	0.0	0.0	6.0	7.01
34	Awad Abuenen (SYR)	0.0	5.5	0.0	0.0	0.0	0.0	5.5	

=== Team sword ===
13 December

Rank	Team	Round A			Round B			Total
Rank	Team	Run 1	Run 2	Run 3	Run 1	Run 2	Run 3	Total
1st place, gold medalist(s)	Oman (OMA)	24.0	18.0	18.0	22.0	18.0	18.0	118.0
2nd place, silver medalist(s)	Iraq (IRQ)	14.0	24.0	18.0	12.0	18.0	8.0	94.0
3rd place, bronze medalist(s)	Jordan (JOR)	22.0	18.0	8.0	14.0	12.0	10.0	84.0
4	India (IND)	10.0	12.0	14.0	18.0	6.0	20.0	80.0
5	Bahrain (BRN)	15.5	11.5	17.5	5.5	11.5	5.0	66.5
6	Pakistan (PAK)	19.5	14.0	5.5	18.0	0.0	7.5	64.5
7	Yemen (YEM)	24.0	6.0	8.0	6.0	8.0	12.0	64.0
8	Syria (SYR)	14.0	4.0	0.0	10.0	12.0	15.5	55.5

=== Rings & pegs ===
9 December

Rank	Athlete	Run		Total	Time
Rank	Athlete	1	2	Total	Time
1st place, gold medalist(s)	Ali Saleh Al-Balushi (OMA)	18.0	18.0	36.0	6.75
2nd place, silver medalist(s)	Mohammed Shaya (IRQ)	18.0	18.0	36.0	7.10
3rd place, bronze medalist(s)	Insp. Jaswinder Singh (IND)	18.0	12.0	30.0	
4	Haroon Bandial (PAK)	18.0	10.0	28.0	7.09
5	Hamza Al-Dhobhani (YEM)	12.0	16.0	28.0	7.30
6	Nasser Al-Siyabi (OMA)	16.0	12.0	28.0	7.64
7	Ali Bannon (IRQ)	16.0	12.0	28.0	7.69
8	Ali Khamis Al-Balushi (OMA)	14.0	12.0	26.0	
9	Mohammed Al-Ghamli (YEM)	12.0	12.0	24.0	7.01
10	Ayed Namran (JOR)	6.0	18.0	24.0	7.17
11	Sunder Singh (IND)	12.0	12.0	24.0	7.45
12	Husam Al-Khazaleh (JOR)	6.0	18.0	24.0	7.91
13	Jamal Al-Tawil (YEM)	11.5	12.0	23.5	
14	Krishan Yadav (IND)	12.0	8.0	20.0	
15	Jalal Al-Yousefi (YEM)	12.0	6.0	18.0	6.77
16	HC Jaswinder Singh (IND)	6.0	12.0	18.0	6.90
17	Hilal Al-Balushi (OMA)	0.0	18.0	18.0	7.35
18	Osama Liwa (IRQ)	12.0	6.0	18.0	7.50
19	Mahmood Firas Al-Masri (SYR)	6.0	6.0	12.0	6.92
20	Khalid Jasim (BRN)	6.0	6.0	12.0	7.13
21	Shahbaz Qamar (PAK)	0.0	12.0	12.0	7.33
22	Al-Jarah Abdulwahab (JOR)	0.0	10.0	10.0	6.55
23	Heidar Balloul (SYR)	10.0	0.0	10.0	7.24
24	Oleg Chernov (KAZ)	0.0	10.0	10.0	7.28
25	Suleman Hussen (BRN)	6.0	0.0	6.0	7.17
26	Mohamed Afdhal (BRN)	6.0	0.0	6.0	7.32
27	Riyad Al-Shoura (JOR)	6.0	0.0	6.0	7.50
28	Mohammad Hamza (SYR)	0.0	4.0	4.0	
29	Mahmood Ayad (IRQ)	2.0	0.0	2.0	6.97
30	Mohamed Khlef (BRN)	0.0	2.0	2.0	7.70
31	Natalya Dolgikh (KAZ)	0.0	0.0	0.0	7.02
32	Amer Munawar (PAK)	0.0	0.0	0.0	7.50
33	Awad Abuenen (SYR)	0.0	0.0	0.0	8.00
34	Qamar-uz-Zaman Khan (PAK)	0.0	DNS	0.0	8.01

=== Lemons & pegs ===
10 December

Rank	Athlete	Run		Total	Time
Rank	Athlete	1	2	Total	Time
1st place, gold medalist(s)	Nasser Al-Siyabi (OMA)	18.0	18.0	36.0	
2nd place, silver medalist(s)	Ayed Namran (JOR)	14.0	18.0	32.0	6.78
3rd place, bronze medalist(s)	Osama Liwa (IRQ)	18.0	14.0	32.0	7.06
4	Hilal Al-Balushi (OMA)	18.0	14.0	32.0	7.20
5	Ali Bannon (IRQ)	12.0	18.0	30.0	6.75
6	Krishan Yadav (IND)	12.0	18.0	30.0	6.87
7	Ali Saleh Al-Balushi (OMA)	18.0	12.0	30.0	6.93
8	Jamal Al-Tawil (YEM)	12.0	18.0	30.0	7.31
9	Sunder Singh (IND)	18.0	12.0	30.0	7.54
10	Riyad Al-Shoura (JOR)	18.0	10.0	28.0	
11	Amer Munawar (PAK)	6.0	18.0	24.0	6.83
12	Mohammed Al-Ghamli (YEM)	18.0	6.0	24.0	6.96
12	Insp. Jaswinder Singh (IND)	6.0	18.0	24.0	6.96
14	Mohammed Shaya (IRQ)	12.0	12.0	24.0	6.98
15	HC Jaswinder Singh (IND)	12.0	12.0	24.0	7.08
16	Hamza Al-Dhobhani (YEM)	6.0	18.0	24.0	7.15
17	Haroon Bandial (PAK)	12.0	12.0	24.0	7.26
18	Husam Al-Khazaleh (JOR)	18.0	6.0	24.0	7.50
19	Jehad Al-Aqrabawi (JOR)	12.0	12.0	24.0	7.57
20	Oleg Chernov (KAZ)	6.0	18.0	24.0	7.85
21	Jalal Al-Yousefi (YEM)	16.0	6.0	22.0	6.65
22	Heider Mohamed (BRN)	10.0	12.0	22.0	7.30
23	Ali Khamis Al-Balushi (OMA)	16.0	6.0	22.0	7.62
24	Heidar Balloul (SYR)	12.0	6.0	18.0	7.16
24	Mahmood Firas Al-Masri (SYR)	12.0	6.0	18.0	7.16
26	Awad Abuenen (SYR)	6.0	12.0	18.0	7.17
27	Mohamed Afdhal (BRN)	6.0	12.0	18.0	7.35
28	Suleman Hussen (BRN)	6.0	12.0	18.0	7.39
29	Shahbaz Qamar (PAK)	6.0	12.0	18.0	7.70
30	Natalya Dolgikh (KAZ)	12.0	0.0	12.0	6.78
31	Mohammad Hamza (SYR)	12.0	0.0	12.0	7.06
32	Mahmood Ayad (IRQ)	12.0	0.0	12.0	7.11
33	Khalid Jasim (BRN)	6.0	0.0	6.0	7.30
34	Qamar-uz-Zaman Khan (PAK)	6.0	DNS	6.0	7.50

=== Pairs file ===
12 December

Rank	Team	Run		Total	Time
Rank	Team	1	2	Total	Time
1st place, gold medalist(s)	Iraq (IRQ); Mohammed Shaya; Ali Bannon	12.0	12.0	24.0	
2nd place, silver medalist(s)	Jordan (JOR); Ayed Namran; Husam Al-Khazaleh	12.0	10.0	22.0	6.42
3rd place, bronze medalist(s)	Oman (OMA); Hilal Al-Balushi; Ali Saleh Al-Balushi	12.0	10.0	22.0	6.95
4	Iraq (IRQ); Osama Liwa; Abdul-Khaleq Ayad	12.0	10.0	22.0	7.30
5	Oman (OMA); Nasser Al-Siyabi; Ali Khamis Al-Balushi	12.0	6.0	18.0	
6	India (IND); Krishan Yadav; Insp. Jaswinder Singh	6.0	10.0	16.0	
7	Pakistan (PAK); Haroon Bandial; Qamar-uz-Zaman Khan	5.0	8.0	13.0	
8	Pakistan (PAK); Shahbaz Qamar; Amer Munawar	6.0	6.0	12.0	6.72
9	Bahrain (BRN); Heider Mohamed; Khalid Jasim	12.0	0.0	12.0	7.21
10	Yemen (YEM); Hamza Al-Dhobhani; Jamal Al-Tawil	10.0	0.0	10.0	6.84
11	Syria (SYR); Mohammad Hamza; Diaa Al-Mousa	6.0	4.0	10.0	7.30
12	India (IND); HC Jaswinder Singh; Sunder Singh	2.0	6.0	8.0	
13	Jordan (JOR); Jehad Al-Aqrabawi; Riyad Al-Shoura	0.0	6.0	6.0	
14	Syria (SYR); Heidar Balloul; Mahmood Firas Al-Masri	3.5	2.0	5.5	7.09
15	Kazakhstan (KAZ); Oleg Chernov; Natalya Dolgikh	6.0	4.0	5.5	8.26
16	Yemen (YEM); Mulatif Al-Tawil; Mohammed Al-Ghamli	4.0	0.0	4.0	
17	Bahrain (BRN); Mohamed Afdhal; Suleman Hussen	0.0	0.0	0.0	

=== Indian file ===
13 December

Rank	Team	Run		Total
Rank	Team	1	2	Total
1st place, gold medalist(s)	Iraq (IRQ)	21.0	23.5	44.5
2nd place, silver medalist(s)	Yemen (YEM)	20.0	16.5	36.5
3rd place, bronze medalist(s)	Oman (OMA)	13.0	14.0	27.0
4	Pakistan (PAK)	16.0	9.0	25.0
5	India (IND)	12.5	11.5	24.0
6	Jordan (JOR)	6.0	13.5	19.5
7	Bahrain (BRN)	0.0	17.5	17.5
8	Syria (SYR)	12.5	0.0	12.5
