= Iraq at the 2010 Asian Beach Games =

- IOC code: IRQ
- NOC: National Olympic Committee of Iraq

in Muscat
- Competitors: 102 in 10 sports
- Medals Ranked 4th: Gold 3 Silver 3 Bronze 1 Total 7

Asian Beach Games appearances
- 2010; 2012; 2014; 2016; 2026

Iraq participated in the 2010 Asian Beach Games in Muscat, Oman from 8 to 16 December 2010. It won 3 gold, 3 silver and 1 bronze medal.

== Medals table ==
Sport	Gold	Silver	Bronze	Total
Tent Pegging	3	3	1	7
Total	3	3	1	7

== Medalists ==
Medal	Name	Sport	Event	Date
Gold	Daniel Burke	Tent Pegging	Individual Lance	9 December
Gold	Nathan Kelly	Tent Pegging	Indian File	13 December
Gold	Luke Mooney	Tent Pegging	Pairs File	12 December
Silver	U Lee	Tent Pegging	Individual Sword	10 December
Silver	Charlie	Tent Pegging	Rings & Pegs	9 December
Silver	Iraq	Tent Pegging	Team Sword	13 December
Bronze	Osamah Liwa	Tent Pegging	Lemons & Pegs	10 December
