= Avatar Tor.Morsri =

Thai Muay Thai kickboxer

Avatar
- Born: 27 September 1993 (age 33); Saraburi, Thailand
- Other names: Koban Suranareegym (โคบาล สุรนารียิม); Avatar Somasakorsang (อวตาร สมศักดิ์ก่อสร้าง)
- Nationality: Thai
- Height: 1.71 m (5 ft 7 1/2 in)
- Weight: 65.8 kg (145 lb; 10 st)
- Division: Welterweight; Super welterweight Middleweight; Super middleweight
- Style: Muay Thai
- Stance: Orthodox
- Fighting out of: Bangkok, Thailand
- Team: Tor.Morsri

Kickboxing record
- Total: 137
- Wins: 89
- Losses: 45
- Draws: 3

Avatar Tor.Morsri (Thai: อวตาร ต.หมอศรี; born September 27, 1993), is a Thai professional Muay Thai fighter.

== Titles and accomplishments ==
- ONE Championship
  - Performance of the Night (One time) vs. Antar Kacem
- Topking World Series
  - 2018 Topking Thailand Series -70 kg Champion
- World Professional Muaythai Federation
  - 2017 WPMF World Middleweight -160 lbs Champion
  - 2017 WPMF World Super Middleweight -168 lbs Champion

== Fight record ==
Muay Thai record
90 Wins (16 (T)KO's), 46 Losses, 3 Draws
Date	Result	Opponent	Event	Location	Method	Round	Time
2026-05-30		(Turkey) Erdem Dincer	Rajadamnern World Series, Rajadamnern Stadium	Bangkok, Thailand			
2026-01-17	Win	(United Kingdom) George Mouzakitis	Rajadamnern World Series, Rajadamnern Stadium	Bangkok, Thailand	Decision (Unanimous)	3	3:00
2025-04-04	Win	(United States) Kendu Irving	ONE Friday Fights 103, Lumpinee Stadium	Bangkok, Thailand	Decision (Unanimous)	3	3:00
2024-05-31	Loss	(Russia) Abdulla Dayakaev	ONE Friday Fights 65, Lumpinee Stadium	Bangkok, Thailand	Decision (Majority)	3	3:00
2024-03-15	Loss	(Russia) Kiamran Nabati	ONE Friday Fights 55, Lumpinee Stadium	Bangkok, Thailand	Decision (Unanimous)	3	3:00
2024-02-09	Win	(Belarus) Antar Kacem	ONE Friday Fights 51, Lumpinee Stadium	Bangkok, Thailand	TKO (Knee to the body)	3	1:48
2023-12-08	Win	(China) Wang Kaifeng	ONE Friday Fights 44, Lumpinee Stadium	Bangkok, Thailand	Decision (Unanimous)	3	3:00
2023-07-14	Win	(Turkey) Ferzan Çiçek	ONE Friday Fights 25, Lumpinee Stadium	Bangkok, Thailand	Decision (Split)	3	3:00
2023-05-19	Win	(Thailand) Komawut FA.Group	ONE Friday Fights 17, Lumpinee Stadium	Bangkok, Thailand	Decision (Unanimous)	3	3:00
2023-03-31	Loss	(Thailand) Komawut FA.Group	ONE Friday Fights 11, Lumpinee Stadium	Bangkok, Thailand	Decision (Split)	3	3:00
2023-01-27	Loss	(Iran) Mohammad Siasarani	ONE Friday Fights 2, Lumpinee Stadium	Bangkok, Thailand	Decision (Majority)	3	3:00
2022-09-17	Win	Kaennorasingh D.N.A. Thailand	Road to ONE: Thailand 3, Lumpinee Stadium	Bangkok, Thailand	KO (Punches)	2	1:21
Road to ONE Muay Thai Featherweight Semi-Finals.
2022-08-13	Win	(Thailand) Wanchalerm Pakyok P.K.	Road to ONE: Thailand 2, Lumpinee Stadium	Bangkok, Thailand	Decision (Unanimous)	3	3:00
Road to ONE Muay Thai Featherweight Quarter-Finals.
2022-05-28	Loss	(Morocco) Youssef Boughanem	Fairtex Fight, Lumpinee Stadium	Bangkok, Thailand	Decision	3	3:00
2022-04-16	Win	(Iran) Reza Ahmadnezad	Fighter X	Hua Hin, Thailand	Decision	5	3:00
2020-11-08	Win	(Brazil) Victor Almeida	Muay Thai Super Champ	Bangkok, Thailand	Decision	3	3:00
2020-10-04	Win	(Switzerland) Gligor Stojanov	Muay Thai Super Champ	Bangkok, Thailand	TKO (Uppercuts)	3	
2020-09-06	Win	(India) Attin Gaur	Muay Thai Super Champ	Bangkok, Thailand	Decision	3	3:00
2020-03-22	Loss	(Japan) Hiromi Wajima	K-1: K'Festa 3, -70 kg Championship Tournament Quarter Finals	Saitama, Japan	KO (Low Kick)	3	0:40
2020-03-14	Loss	(Cambodia) Vong Vichhai	Sea TV Kun Khmer	Cambodia	Decision	5	3:00
2020-02-16	Win	(Cambodia) Roeung Sophorn	Kun Khmer	Cambodia	Decision	5	3:00
2020-02-01	Loss	(Cambodia) Lao Chetra	CNC Kun Khmer	Cambodia	Decision	5	3:00
2019-10-27	Loss	(Australia) Chadd Collins	MX MUAY XTREME	Bangkok, Thailand	Decision	3	3:00
2019-09-22	Win	(Iran) Reza Ahmadnezhad	MX Muay Xtreme	Bangkok, Thailand	Decision	3	3:00
2019-09-01	Win	(Cambodia) Thoeun Theara	Bayon TV	Cambodia	Decision	5	3:00
2019-08-04	Win	(Italy) Lorenzo Di Vara	MX Muay Xtreme	Bangkok, Thailand	TKO (Elbow)	1	
2019-07-27	Win	(Cambodia) Thoeun Theara	TV5 Kun Khmer	Cambodia	Decision	5	3:00
2019-06-23	Win	(Poland) Piotr Lagozki	MX Muay Xtreme	Bangkok, Thailand	TKO (Middle kicks)	2	
2019-06-09	Win	(Cambodia) Roeung Sophorn	SeaTV	Cambodia	Decision	5	3:00
2019-03-30	Loss	(France) Rafi Bohic	Muaythai Singpatong	Phuket, Thailand	Decision	5	3:00
2019-03-17	Loss	(Thailand) Pongsiri P.K.Saenchaimuaythaigym	Chang MuayThai Kiatpetch, OrTorGor.3 Stadium	Nonthaburi Province, Thailand	Decision	5	3:00
2019-02-23	Win	(Brazil) Diego Beneduzzi	Top King World Series 28	Surat Thani, Thailand	Decision	3	3:00
2018-12-31	Win	(Thailand) Simanut Sor.Sarinya	Top King World Series 27, Final	Pattaya, Thailand	TKO (Left Elbow)	2	
Wins Topking Thailand Series Final -70kg title.
2018-12-31	Win	(Thailand) Saifahlab Sitkruthai	Top King World Series 27, Semi Final	Pattaya, Thailand	KO (Left Elbow)	2	
2018-11-25	Win	(Morocco) Brahim Machkour	Top King World Series 25	Thailand	KO (Knee to the body)	2	
2018-10-28	Win	(United Kingdom) Curtis Allen	Top King World Series 24	Thailand	TKO	2	
2018-09-30	Win	(Brazil) Fabio Ferrari	Top King World Series 22	Samui, Thailand	Decision	3	3:00
2018-09-07	Win	(Iran) Reza Ahmadnezhad	MX Muay Xtreme	Bangkok, Thailand	Decision	3	3:00
2018-08-08	Loss	(Thailand) Talaytong Sor.Thanaphet		Thailand	Decision	5	3:00
For the Thailand -154 lbs title.
2018-07-15	Loss	(Thailand) Pongsiri P.K.Saenchaimuaythaigym	MuayThaiJedsee, Channel 7 Stadium	Bangkok, Thailand	Decision	5	3:00
2018-06-16	Win	(Thailand) Petchsanguan Sor.Chanasit	Top King World Series 21, Final	Surat Thani, Thailand	KO (Punches)	2	
Wins Topking Thailand Series -70kg tournament.
2018-06-16	Win	(Thailand) Aroondej Phran26	Top King World Series 21, Semi Final	Surat Thani, Thailand	Decision	3	3:00
2018-05-18	Win	(Sweden) Magnus Andersson	MX Muay Xtreme	Bangkok, Thailand	Decision	3	3:00
2018-05-03	Loss	(France) Yohan Lidon	MFC 7	France	KO (Right High Kick)	3	
For the WPMF MFC -79kg title.
2018-02-16	Win	(Brazil) Bruno Miranda	MX Muay Xtreme	Bangkok, Thailand	Decision	3	3:00
2018-01-01	Win	(Thailand) Fahsura Wor.Phetpool		Thailand	KO	4	
2017-12-10	Loss	(Thailand) Suayngam Pumpanmuang		Thailand	Decision	5	3:00
2017-11-17	Win	(Uzbekistan) Mansurbek Toribov	MX Muay Xtreme	Bangkok, Thailand	Decision	3	3:00
2017-09-01	Win	(Brazil) Jenson Constantine	MX Muay Xtreme	Bangkok, Thailand	TKO	2	
2017-07-28	Win	(Uzbekistan) Ruslan Ataev	WPMF at Nang Loeng Horse Stadium	Bangkok, Thailand	Decision	5	3:00
Wins WPMF World -160 lbs title.
2017-06-09	Win	(Brazil) Vanderlei Santos	MX Muay Xtreme	Bangkok, Thailand	Decision	3	3:00
2017-05-12	Win	(United States) Gregory Sanzo	MX Muay Xtreme	Bangkok, Thailand	KO (Elbows)	2	
2017-04-07	Win	(Turkey) Kadir Tastan	MX Muay Xtreme	Bangkok, Thailand	Decision	5	3:00
2017-03-16	Win	(Sweden) Tobias Alexandersson	Nai Khanom Tom	Ayuthaya, Thailand	Decision	5	3:00
Wins WPMF World -168 lbs title.
2016-	Win	(Thailand)	MAX Muay Thai	Pattaya, Thailand	Decision	3	3:00
2016-10-07	Win	(Thailand) Wanchalerm Thanasuranakorn	MAX Muay Thai	Pattaya, Thailand	Decision	3	3:00
2016-01-07	Loss	(Cambodia) Prom Samnang	SEA TV Boxing	Cambodia	Decision	5	
2015-10-26	Loss	(Thailand) Talaytong Sor.Thanaphet		Chiang Mai, Thailand	Decision	5	3:00
2015-	Loss	(Thailand) Suayngam Pumpanmuang		Mahasarakham, Thailand	Decision	5	3:00
2015-	Loss	(Thailand) Nuttadaj Phran26		Thailand	Decision	5	3:00
2015-02-16	Loss	(Thailand) Diesellek Uddonmuang		Thailand	Decision	5	3:00
2015-	Win	(Belgium) Yassine Boughanem		Thailand	Decision	5	3:00
2014-11-01	NC	(Thailand) Teedet Sitjakun	Omnoi Stadium - Isuzu Cup	Samut Sakhon, Thailand	Referee stoppage	4	
Referee stopped the fight due to Avatar not fighting to his best ability. Avatar later admitted he was paid to lose.
2014-09-13	Loss	(Thailand) Armin Pumpanmuang	Omnoi Stadium	Samut Sakhon, Thailand	Decision	5	3:00
Legend: Win Loss Draw/No contest Notes

== Lethwei record ==
Lethwei record
Date	Result	Opponent	Event	Location	Method	Round	Time
2023-08-20	Draw	(Myanmar) Kyaw Swar Win	Myanmar Lethwei World Championship	Yangon, Myanmar	Draw	5	3:00
2019-12-13	Draw	(Myanmar) Thway Thit Win Hlaing	Lethwei Challenge Fight Mandalay	Mandalay, Myanmar	Draw	5	3:00
2019-01-31	Draw	(Myanmar) Soe Lin Oo	Win Sein Taw Ya 2019	Mudon Township, Myanmar	Draw	5	3:00
Legend: Win Loss Draw/No contest Notes
