= Sean Clancy (fighter) =

Irish Muay Thai fighter (born 1988)

- Born: 30 December 1988 (age 37); Cork, Ireland
- Nickname: "Clubber"
- Height: 1.76 m (5 ft 9 1/2 in)
- Weight: 65.2 kg (144 lb; 10 st 4 lb)
- Division: Lightweight; Super Lightweight
- Fighting out of: Cork, Ireland
- Team: Siam Warrior Ireland; Yodyut Muay Thai Thailand
- Trainer: Martin Horgan
- Years active: 2009–present

Kickboxing record
- Total: 63
- Wins: 44
- By knockout: 22
- Losses: 18
- Draws: 1

Other information
- Boxing record from BoxRec

Sean Clancy (born 30 December 1988) is an Irish Muay thai fighter and the reigning WBC Muaythai Super Lightweight World Champion.

He is the former WBC Muaythai Super Lightweight International champion, the former Cage Muaythai Super Lightweight champion and ISKA Irish Welterweight champion. He was the 2019 WBC Muaythai "Male Fighter of the Year".

He is currently signed with ONE Championship and will compete in their Bantamweight Muaythai division.

== Muay Thai career ==
Fighting in Lumpini Stadium, Clancy took on Matt Sheady. He won the fight by a second round TKO, after a series of knees and elbows.

During Cage Kings' inaugural event, Clancy fought against his fellow Irish Nak Muay Paul Budden. Clancy won the fight by a unanimous decision.

Clancy stepped in as a late notice replacement to face the multi divisional Lumpini Stadium champion Saenchai during THAI FIGHT Samui 2016. Clancy lost in the third round, by TKO.

Clancy fought for the Caged Muaythai Super Lightweight tile against Matthew Bune during CMT 10. Cage Muaythai differed from the usual muaythai fights in that the competitors fought in the 4 oz gloves, typically used in mixed martial arts, instead of the larger boxing gloves. Clancy won the fight by a fourth round TKO.

In 2018 Clancy participated in the K-1 Super Lightweight Tournament, being scheduled to face Jun Nakazawa in the tournament quarter finals. Clancy lost the quarter-final bout, losing by TKO in the very first round of the fight.

Sean Clancy fought against Roy Willis for the International Super Lightweight WBC Muaythai title during Lion Fight 52. Clancy won the fight by split decision, with two judges scoring in his favor (48-47, 49-48) and one judge scoring the fight for Willis (50-45).

Following his capture of the WBC Muaythai International title, Clancy was given an opportunity to fight for the World Super Lightweight title as well. He was scheduled to face Alessandro Sara at the Neptune Stadium in Cork. Clancy won the fight through a unanimous decision.

He afterwards fought during Lion Fight 60 against Ramesh Habib for the Lion Fight World Super Lightweight title. He was unable to mount a comeback after being dropped in the first round, and lost a unanimous decision.

Clancy's first fight in ONE Championship was against Pongsiri P.K.Saenchaimuaythaigym, during ONE Championship: A New Breed 2. Clancy lost a unanimous decision.

Clancy faced Tawanchai P.K. Saenchaimuaythaigym at ONE Championship: Dangal on 15 May 2021. He lost the bout via head kick knockout at the beginning of the third round.

== Championships and accomplishments ==
- International Sport Karate Association
  - ISKA Irish Welterweight Muay Thai Championship
    - Two successful title defenses
- Cage Kings
  - CK World Super Lightweight Championship
- Caged Muay Thai
  - CMT World Super Lightweight Championship
- World Boxing Council Muaythai
  - WBC Muaythai International Super Lightweight Championship
  - WBC Muaythai World Super Lightweight Championship
  - 2019 Male Fighter of the Year

== Muay thai record ==
Professional kickboxing record
44 wins (22 (T)KOs), 19 losses, 1 draw, 0 no contests
Date	Result	Opponent	Event	Location	Method	Round	Time
2023-03-28	Loss	(Thailand) Saeksan Or. Kwanmuang	ONE Friday Fights 14, Lumpinee Stadium	Bangkok, Thailand	TKO (doctor stoppage/cut)	2	2:22
2021-5-15	Loss	(Thailand) Tawanchai P.K. Saenchaimuaythaigym	ONE Championship: Dangal	Kallang, Singapore	KO (head kick)	3	0:35
2020-9-11	Loss	(Thailand) Pongsiri P.K.Saenchaimuaythaigym	ONE Championship: A New Breed 2	Bangkok, Thailand	Decision (unanimous)	3	3:00
2019-9-21	Loss	(Australia) Ramesh Habib	Lion Fight 60	Las Vegas, Nevada, United States	Decision (unanimous)	5	3:00
For the Lion Fight World Super Lightweight title.
2019-7-20	Win	(Italy) Alessandro Sara	Siam Warriors Superfights	Cork, Ireland	Decision (unanimous)	5	3:00
Wins the WBC Muaythai World Super Lightweight title.
2019-3-16	Win	(Australia) Roy Willis	Lion Fight 52	Dublin, Ireland	Decision (split)	5	3:00
Wins the WBC Muaythai International Super Lightweight title.
2018-11-3	Loss	(Japan) Jun Nakazawa	K-1 World GP 2018: 3rd Super Lightweight, Quarter-finals	Saitama, Japan	TKO (punches)	1	1:09
2018-10-13	Win	(Republic of Ireland) Chris Mauceri	Lion Fight 48	Cork, Ireland	Decision (unanimous)	3	3:00
2017-11-24	Loss	(United Kingdom) Charlie Peters	KGP	Baghdad, Iraq	TKO	1	
2017-10-10	Draw	(Republic of Ireland) Dommie Kelly	Siam Warriors: Fight Night	Cork, Ireland	Decision (unanimous)	5	3:00
Defends the ISKA Irish Welterweight title.
2017-9-7	Win	(Thailand) Padsaenlek Rachanon	Samui Fight 2017	Ko Samui, Thailand	Decision (unanimous)	5	3:00
2017-8-4	Win	(New Zealand) Matthew Bune	Caged Muaythai 10	Crestmead, Queensland	TKO	4	
Wins the Caged Muaythai Super Lightweight title.
2017-4-29	Loss	(Thailand) Kongsak P.K. Saenchai Muaythaigym	THAI FIGHT Samui 2017	Ko Samui, Thailand	KO (left hook)	1	
2017-3-5	Win	(Thailand) Looktum Hollywoodpattaya	Max Muaythai	Pattaya, Thailand	Decision	5	3:00
2016-6-4	Win	(Republic of Ireland) Robert NG	Siam Warriors Muaythai Show	Cork, Ireland	Decision (unanimous)	5	3:00
Wins the ISKA Irish Welterweight title.
2016-4-30	Loss	(Thailand) Saenchai	THAI FIGHT Samui 2016	Ko Samui, Thailand	TKO	3	
2015-12-5	Win	(New Zealand) Matthew Bune	Caged Muaythai 7	Crestmead, Queensland	Decision (unanimous)	3	3:00
2014-11-11	Win	(Republic of Ireland) Paul Budden	Cage Kings 1	Cork, Ireland	Decision (unanimous)	3	3:00
Wins the Cage Kings World Super Lightweight title.
2014-2-2	Win	(United Kingdom) Matt Sheedy	Lumpini Stadium	Bangkok, Thailand	TKO (knees and elbows)	2	
2013-10-12	Win	(Republic of Ireland) Andy Grey	Judgement Day	Cork, Ireland	Decision	5	3:00
2013-4-13	Loss	(Italy) Angelo Campoli	Last Man Standing, Tournament Semifinals	Birmingham, United Kingdom	TKO (doctor stoppage)	1	
2013-4-13	Win	(United Kingdom) Matt McKoown	Last Man Standing, Tournament Quarterfinals	Birmingham, United Kingdom	Decision	5	3:00
Legend: Win Loss Draw/no contest Notes
