= Tsukuru Midorikawa =

Japanese kickboxer and boxer (born 1986)

- Born: 緑川 創 December 13, 1986 (age 39); Tokyo, Japan
- Height: 171 cm (5 ft 7 in)
- Weight: 67.0 kg (147.7 lb; 10.55 st)
- Style: Muay Thai, Kickboxing
- Stance: Orthodox
- Fighting out of: Tokyo, Japan
- Team: RIKIX

Professional boxing record
- Total: 7
- Wins: 6
- By knockout: 4
- Losses: 1

Kickboxing record
- Total: 86
- Wins: 56
- By knockout: 25
- Losses: 18
- Draws: 10
- No contests: 2

Other information
- Boxing record from BoxRec

Tsukuru Midorikawa is a Japanese kickboxer, Muay Thai fighter and boxer.

== Kickboxing career ==
On February 11, 2014, Midorikawa defeated Andy Souwer by split decision at Rikix: No Kick, No Life 2014 in Tokyo.

On June 27, 2018 Midorikawa faced Sibmuen Sitchefboontham for the vacant Rajadamnern Stadium 154 lbs title. He lost the fight by decision.

Midorikawa faced BeyNoah at RISE 140 on July 19, 2020. He won the fight by unanimous decision.

Midorikawa faced Kaito Ono at RISE DEAD or ALIVE Yokohama on October 11, 2020. He lost the fight by majority decision, with two judges scoring the bout 30–28 for Ono, while the third judge had it scored as an even 30–30.

Midorikawa faced Lee Sung-hyun in a non-title bout at RISE 161 on August 28, 2022. The fight was ruled a majority decision draw after the first three rounds, with two judges scoring it as an even 29–29 and 30–30 draw, while the third judge had it scored 30–29 for Midorikawa. The fight was once again ruled a majority draw, after an extra fourth round was contested.

For his kickboxing rules retirement bout Midorikawa faced Kaito Ono at NO KICK NO LIFE on February 11, 2023. He lost the fight by a third-round technical knockout. Ono twice knocked his opponent down, with an elbow in the first round and a left hook in the third round.

== Titles and accomplishments ==
=== Kickboxing ===
- Shin Nihon Kickboxing Association
  - 2009 SNKA Welterweight Champion
    - Four successful title defenses
- World Kick Boxing Association
  - 2019 WKBA World Super Welterweight Champion

=== Boxing ===
- Oriental and Pacific Boxing Federation
  - 2025 OPBF Super welterweight Champion
    - One successful title defense

Awards

- Efight.jp
  - Efight "Fighter of the Month" (November 2025)

== Professional boxing record ==
7 fights	6 wins	1 loss
By knockout	4	0
By decision	2	1

No.	Result	Record	Opponent	Type	Round, time	Date	Location	Notes
7	Loss	6–1	Ryota Toyoshima	UD	10	16 Aug 2026	Korakuen Hall, Tokyo, Japan	Lost OPBF super welterwieght title; For WBO Asia Pacific super welterweight title
6	Win	6–0	Hisashi Kato	TKO	7 (10), 2:12	3 Apr 2026	Korakuen Hall, Tokyo, Japan	Retained OPBF super welterweight title
5	Win	5–0	Nath Nwachukwu	SD	10	27 Nov 2025	Korakuen Hall, Tokyo, Japan	Won OPBF super welterweight title
4	Win	4–0	Padyod Kiadcharoensiri	TKO	4 (8), 2:29	17 Sep 2025	Korakuen Hall, Tokyo, Japan	
3	Win	3–0	Yuki Hamashima	TKO	5 (8), 2:44	12 May 2025	Korakuen Hall, Tokyo, Japan	
2	Win	2–0	Mao Tameda	TKO	4 (6), 1:31	31 dec 2024	Ota City General Gymnasium, Tokyo, Japan	
1	Win	1–0	Dacong Wang	UD	6	31 Oct 2024	Korakuen Hall, Tokyo, Japan	

== Muay Thai and Kickboxing record ==
Professional Kickboxing & Muay Thai Record
56 Wins (25 (T)KO's), 18 Losses, 10 Draws, 2 No Contest
Date	Result	Opponent	Event	Location	Method	Round	Time
2023-02-11	Loss	(Japan) Kaito Ono	NO KICK NO LIFE	Tokyo, Japan	TKO (Referee stoppage)	3	0:57
2022-12-10	Draw	(Argentina) Ricardo Bravo	RISE 163	Tokyo, Japan	Ext.R Decision (Split)	4	3:00
2022-08-28	Draw	(South Korea) Lee Sung-hyun	RISE 161	Tokyo, Japan	Ext.R Decision (Majority)	4	3:00
2022-05-28	Win	(Japan) T-98	NO KICK NO LIFE	Tokyo, Japan	Decision (Unanimous)	3	3:00
2022-04-24	Loss	(Japan) Toshiyuki Obara	Suk Wanchai MuayThai Super Fight	Nagoya, Japan	TKO (Doctor stoppage)		
2022-01-09	Win	(Thailand) Playchumphon Sor.Srisompong	NO KICK NO LIFE	Tokyo, Japan	Decision (Unanimous)	5	3:00
2021-12-12	Loss	(Japan) Ryotaro	RISE 153	Tokyo, Japan	Decision (Unanimous)	3	3:00
2021-09-26	Win	(Japan) Kei Kakinuma	Battle Of MuayThai – ouroboros 2021 –	Tokyo, Japan	KO (Straight to the Body)	2	1:25
2021-08-22	Win	(Japan) Motoyasukku	Japan Kick CHALLENGER.3 〜Beyond the limit〜	Tokyo, Japan	Decision	5	3:00
2021-07-22	Draw	(Japan) Yuya	NO KICK NO LIFE Shin Shou Yuigadokuson	Tokyo, Japan	Decision	3	3:00
2021-06-18	Win	(Japan) Hirokatsu Miyagi	RISE 150	Tokyo, Japan	Decision (Majority)	3	3:00
2021-02-24	Win	(Japan) Kakushi Takagi	NO KICK NO LIFE Shin Shou Ungaisouten	Tokyo, Japan	Decision (Unanimous)	3	3:00
2020-12-18	Loss	(Japan) Yuya	RISE 144	Tokyo, Japan	Ext.R Decision (Unanimous)	4	3:00
2020-10-11	Loss	(Japan) Kaito	RISE DEAD OR ALIVE 2020 Yokohama	Yokohama, Japan	Decision (Unanimous)	3	3:00
2020-07-19	Win	(Japan) BeyNoah	RISE 140	Tokyo, Japan	Decision (Unanimous)	3	3:00
2020-04-17	Win	(Japan) Yamato Nishikawa	Road to ONE 2nd	Tokyo, Japan	Decision (Unanimous)	3	3:00
2019-12-08	Win	(Thailand) Gamlaipet AyothayaFightgym	SNKA SOUL IN THE RING CLIMAX	Tokyo, Japan	Decision (Majority)	5	3:00
Wins WKBA World Super Welterweight title.
2019-11-17	Win	(Thailand) Chuchai Hadesworkout	JAPAN KICKBOXING INNOVATION 6	Okayama, Japan	Decision (Unanimous)	3	3:00
2019-06-01	Loss	(Thailand) Khunsuk Sitchefboontham	BOM SEASON II vol.2-The Battle Of Muaythai	Yokohama, Japan	Decision (Unanimous)	5	3:00
For the Rajadamnern Stadium Super Welterweight title.
2019-04-14	Win	(Thailand) Petkangtong Por. Phetsiri	SNKA TITANS NEOS 25	Tokyo, Japan	TKO	3	1:44
2019-02-11	Win	(Japan) Kentaro Hokuto	KNOCK OUT 2019 WINTER THE ANSWER IS IN THE RING	Tokyo, Japan	Decision (Unanimous)	5	3:00
2018-12-09	Win	(Cambodia) Sareem Bantong	SNKA SOUL IN THE RING 16	Tokyo, Japan	TKO	3	0:27
2018-10-08	Loss	(Japan) Hinata	REBELS.58	Tokyo, Japan	Decision (Majority)	3	3:00
2018-08-18	Win	(Japan) Hiroki Shishido	KNOCK OUT SUMMER FES.2018	Tokyo, Japan	TKO (Doctor Stoppage)	2	1:26
2018-06-27	Loss	(Thailand) Sibmean Sitchefboontham	Rajadamnern Stadium	Bangkok, Thailand	Decision	5	3:00
For the vacant Rajadamnern Stadium Super Welterweight title.
2018-04-15	Win	(Argentina) Anibal Cianciaruso	SNKA TITANS NEOS 23	Tokyo, Japan	TKO	1	2:45
2017-12-10	Win	(Thailand) Sakuntong Torponchai	SNKA SOUL IN THE RING 15	Tokyo, Japan	KO (Corner Stoppage)	2	1:44
2017-10-22	Win	(Thailand) Ponpanom PetpumMuaythai	SNKA MAGNUM 45	Tokyo, Japan	KO (Right Low Kick)	3	1:29
2017-08-20	Loss	(Japan) Soichiro Miyakoshi	KNOCK OUT vol.4	Tokyo, Japan	Decision (Unanimous)	5	3:00
2017-07-02	Win	(Thailand) Gen PetpumMuaythai	SNKA MAGNUM 44	Tokyo, Japan	TKO	1	1:02
2017-05-14	Loss	(Thailand) Duangsomgpong Nayokathasala	SNKA WINNERS 2017 2nd	Tokyo, Japan	Decision (Unanimous)	3	3:00
2017-03-12	Win	(Thailand) Tananchai Sor.Lakchart	SNKA MAGNUM 43	Tokyo, Japan	TKO (Left Hook)	3	0:26
2016-12-11	Win	(Thailand) Ikkiusang PepporMuaythai	SNKA SOUL IN THE RING XIV	Tokyo, Japan	TKO (Left Knee)	5	2:10
2016-10-23	Draw	(Thailand) Sibmean Sitchefboontham	SNKA MAGNUM 42	Tokyo, Japan	Decision	5	3:00
2016-05-15	Win	(Thailand) Pakkao Taponenganeun	SNKA WINNERS 2016 2nd	Tokyo, Japan	TKO (Corner Stoppage)	4	2:32
2016-03-13	Win	(Japan) Makoto Kimura	SNKA MAGNUM 40	Tokyo, Japan	Decision (Majority)	5	3:00
2015-12-13	Win	(Thailand) Superbarn HontornMuaythaigym	SNKA SOUL IN THE RING 13	Tokyo, Japan	KO (Left Hook)	3	1:09
2015-10-25	Win	(Korea) Jin Shijun	SNKA MAGNUM 39	Tokyo, Japan	TKO (Doctor Stoppage)	3	0:28
2015-07-12	Loss	(Thailand) Remtong Tor.Ponchai	SNKA MAGNUM 38	Tokyo, Japan	TKO (Doctor Stoppage)	4	1:13
2015-04-19	Win	(Thailand) Parannem Sor.Tilabsun	SNKA TITANS NEOS 17	Tokyo, Japan	TKO (Doctor Stoppage)	4	2:39
2015-02-11	Loss	(Brazil) Jose Ingramgym	NO KICK NO LIFE 2015	Tokyo, Japan	TKO (Doctor Stoppage)	3	2:22
2014-12-14	Win	(Japan) Kenji Watanabe	SNKA Soul in the Ring XII	Tokyo, Japan	Decision (Unanimous)	3	3:00
2014-10-26	Win	(Thailand) Petlampun Sitsamart	SNKA MAGNUM 36	Tokyo, Japan	KO	5	1:28
2014-07-20	Win	(Thailand) Pongsiri P.K.Saenchaimuaythaigym	SNKA MAGNUM 35	Tokyo, Japan	Decision (Unanimous)	5	3:00
2014-04-20	Win	(Thailand) Daonoi Mor.Puwana	SNKA TITANS NEOS 15	Tokyo, Japan	KO	1	2:00
2014-02-11	Win	(Netherlands) Andy Souwer	Rikix: No Kick No Life 2014	Tokyo, Japan	Decision (Split)	3	3:00
2013-12-08	Draw	(Japan) Kenji Watanabe	SNKA SOUL IN THE RING VI	Tokyo, Japan	Decision	5	3:00
Defends SNKA Welterweight title.
2013-10-13	Win	(Thailand) Pupanlek Acegym	SNKA MAGNUM 33	Tokyo, Japan	TKO	3	1:39
2013-07-21	Win	(Japan) Rocky Sodai	SNKA MAGNUM 32	Tokyo, Japan	KO	2	0:46
2013-04-14	Win	(Japan) T-98	REBELS 15	Tokyo, Japan	Decision (Majority)	5	3:00
2013-03-10	Win	(Japan) Togo	SNKA MAGNUM 31	Tokyo, Japan	Decision (Unanimous)	3	3:00
2012-12-09	Win	(Thailand) Suwilek Rajasaklek	SNKA SOUL IN THE RING IX	Tokyo, Japan	TKO	3	1:50
2012-10-14	Win	(Japan) Hayato Otsuka	SNKA MAGNUM 30	Tokyo, Japan	Decision (Unanimous)	5	3:00
Defends SNKA Welterweight title.
2012-08-22	Win	(Thailand) Sailom Sor.Suppatara	Rajadamnern Stadium	Bangkok, Thailand	KO (Punches)	4	
2012-04-22	Loss	(Japan) Atsuhisa Sasatani	SNKA TITANS NEOS 11	Tokyo, Japan	Decision (Majority)	3	3:00
2012-01-15	Loss	(Thailand) Siripong Lukprabat	SNKA BRAVE HEARTS 18	Tokyo, Japan	TKO (Doctor Stoppage)	3	0:33
2011-09-04	Win	(Japan) Yuya Takeuchi	SNKA TITANS NEOS X	Tokyo, Japan	Decision (Unanimous)	3	3:00
2011-07-24	Win	(Japan) Kenji Watanabe	SNKA MAGNUM 26	Tokyo, Japan	Decision (Split)	5	3:00
Defends SNKA Welterweight title.
2011-05-15	Win	(Thailand) Sanmuk Sasiprapa	SNKA BRAVE HEARTS 16	Tokyo, Japan	Ext. R Decision (Unanimous)	4	3:00
2011-04-17	Win	(Japan) Yuki Takewaka	SNKA TITANS NEOS IX	Tokyo, Japan	Decision (Unanimous)	3	3:00
2010-12-18	Win	(Thailand) Sonlam Sor.Udomson	SNKA SOUL IN THE RING VII	Tokyo, Japan	TKO	3	
2010-10-24	Win	(Japan) Choichi Sasaki	SNKA MAGNUM 24	Tokyo, Japan	Decision (Unanimous)	3	3:00
2010-03-07	NC	(Japan) Zen Fujita	SNKA MAGNUM 22	Tokyo, Japan	KO	4	2:26
Defends SNKA Welterweight title.
2009-12-13	Loss	(Thailand) Kunsuk Arabiagym	SNKA SOUL IN THE RING VII	Tokyo, Japan	Decision (Majority)	5	3:00
2009-10-25	Win	(Japan) Kenji Watanabe	SNKA MAGNUM 21	Tokyo, Japan	Decision (Unanimous)	3	3:00
2009-07-12	Win	(Japan) Togo	SNKA MAGNUM 20	Tokyo, Japan	Decision (Unanimous)	3	3:00
2009-05-31	Win	(Japan) Kenji Ogino	SNKA BRAVE HEARTS 11	Tokyo, Japan	KO	5	2:17
Wins SNKA Welterweight title.
2009–02	Win	(Thailand)	Omnoi Stadium	Thailand	KO	4	
2009–	Loss	(Thailand)	Rajadamnern Stadium	Bangkok, Thailand	Decision	5	3:00
2008-12-14	Draw	(Japan) Kenji Watanabe	SNKA SOUL IN THE RING VI	Tokyo, Japan	Decision	3	3:00
2008-10-25	Win	(Japan) Shuhei Tsuchiya	SNKA MAGNUM 18	Tokyo, Japan	Decision (Unanimous)	3	3:00
2008–08-22	Loss	(Thailand) Chaowalit Jockygym	Liboren Fight Night VII	Hong Kong	Decision	5	3:00
2008-06-29	Win	(Japan) Yuto	SNKA ATTACK 8	Tokyo, Japan	KO	1	1:36
2008-04-20	Loss	(Thailand) Isorasak Siseksak	SNKA TITANS NEOS III	Tokyo, Japan	Decision (Unanimous)	3	3:00
2008-02-24	Win	(Japan) Takao Mochida	SNKA ATTACK 7	Tokyo, Japan	Decision (Unanimous)	3	3:00
2007-12-09	Draw	(Japan) Zen Fujita	SNKA Soul in the Ring V	Tokyo, Japan	Decision	3	3:00
2007-09-16	Loss	(Thailand) Sonlam Sor.Udomson	SNKA TITANS NEOS 2	Tokyo, Japan	Decision (Unanimous)	3	3:00
2007-07-08	NC	(Japan) Hirokazu	SNKA ATTACK 5	Tokyo, Japan		1	
2006-12-10	Draw	(Japan) Taishi Sasaki	SNKA SOUL IN THE RING IV	Tokyo, Japan	Decision	3	3:00
2006-09-23	Win	(Thailand) Techarin Chuwattana	SNKA ATTACK 2	Tokyo, Japan	Decision (Majority)	3	3:00
2006-07-16	Draw	(Japan) Takao Mochida	SNKA MAGNUM 11	Tokyo, Japan	Decision	3	3:00
2006-05-21	Draw	(Japan) Taishi Sasaki	SNKA BRAVE HEARTS 2	Tokyo, Japan	Decision	3	3:00
2006-02-26	Win	(Japan) Takashi Goto	SNKA ATTACK	Tokyo, Japan	TKO	1	2:42
2005-12-11	Win	(Japan) Masato Ochiai	SNKA SOUL IN THE RING III	Tokyo, Japan	KO	2	2:02
2005-10-29	Win	(Japan) Shūhei Tsuchiya	SNKA NO KICK, NO LIFE ～FINAL～	Tokyo, Japan	Decision (Majority)	2	3:00
2005-06-12	Win	(Japan) Shinya Uzuki	SNKA Ryusha tachi no Chosen PART VI	Tokyo, Japan	Decision (Unanimous)	2	3:00
Legend: Win Loss Draw/No contest Notes
