= Kiamran Nabati =

Russian kickboxer

- Born: Kiamran Rashidovich Nabati; November 23, 1994 (age 31); Buynaksk, Russia
- Native name: Кямран Рашидович Набати
- Height: 1.78 m (5 ft 10 in)
- Weight: 65 kg (143 lb; 10.2 st)
- Style: Muay Thai, Kickboxing
- Stance: Orthodox
- Fighting out of: Podolsk, Russia
- Team: Varyag Fight Gym
- Trainer: Abdulnasir Madjidov
- Rank: International Master of Sport in Thai boxing
- Years active: 2015 - present

Kickboxing record
- Total: 25
- Wins: 23
- By knockout: 8
- Losses: 1
- No contests: 1

Kiamran Rashidovich Nabati (born November 23, 1994) is a Russian kickboxer and Muay Thai fighter, currently competing in the Bantamweight division of ONE Championship. As of September 22, 2026, he is ranked #5 in the ONE Bantamweight Muay Thai rankings. As an amateur Muay Thai fighter, he was a 5-time Russian Cup champion, 3-time Russian Championships winner, and a multiple-time IFMA medalist in the Junior and Senior championships.

In Muay Thai, Nabati was involved in big doping controversies. In 2017 and 2024, Nabati received 6-year and 4-year bans, respectively, from International Federation of Muaythai Amateur. In 2025 in One Championship he emerged victorious in the bout against Ferrari Fairtex, but the bout was cut short by both Nabati and Ferrari testing positive for banned substances and receiving suspensions, with the fight reversed to a 'no contest'.

== Kickboxing & Muaythai career ==
=== Early career ===
Nabati won multiple medals in international amateur muay thai competitions under the International Federation of Muaythai Associations including a silver medal at the 2015 world championships. In 2015 he received the title of Master of Sports of Russia in the International class. Nabati made his professional debut against Kromsappasamit Jaotalai at Thai Fight Moscow on September 17, 2015 and won by unanimous decision.

In 2017 Nabati received a six year ban from IFMA after a positive test for performance enhancing drugs. Following the ban Nabati focused on the professional side of his career.

Nabati faced Chatchai Sungmao at Muay Thai Night 5 on July 21, 2019. In front of an audience of 1,000 people, he won the fight by a dominant unanimous decision.

Nabati made his Fair Fight promotional debut against Maxim Petkevich at Fair Fight 15 on August 28, 2021, following a two-year absence from professional competition. He won the fight by unanimous decision.

Nabati faced Mavlud Tifiyev at Fair Fight 16 on February 12, 2022. He won the fight by a close unanimous decision.

After notching back-to-back victories with the promotion, Nabati was placed in the Fair Fight Featherweight (-65 kg) tournament, held at Fair Fight 18 on July 15, 2022. He overcame both Said Asatov in the semifinals and Kirill Khomutov in the finals in the same manner - by unanimous decision.

Nabati made his first Fair Fight title defense against Andrey Kromov at RCC Fair Fight 19 on November 26, 2022. He retained the title by unanimous decision.

Nabati made his second Fair Fight title defense against the former Wu Lin Feng China and World -65 kg champion Meng Gaofeng at RCC Fair Fight 21 on June 10, 2023. He retained the title by unanimous decision.

Nabati faced Phal Sophorn at RCC Fair Fight 22 on August 18, 2023. He won the fight by a first-round knockout.

=== ONE Championship ===
Nabati faced Pongsiri P.K.Saenchaimuaythaigym at ONE Friday Fights 35 on September 29, 2023. He won the fight by unanimous decision.

Nabati faced Suablack Tor.Pran49 at ONE Friday Fights 68 on June 28, 2024. He won the fight by a first-round knockout.

Nabati faced Nong-O Gaiyanghadao at ONE Friday Fights 81 on September 27, 2024. He won the fight by unanimous decision.

== Doping suspensions ==
=== IFMA ===
In 2017, Nabati received a 6-year ban from International Federation of Muaythai Amateur for testing positive for clenbuterol and tampering.

In November 2024, Nabati received a 4-year ban from International Federation of Muaythai Amateur for testing positive for clenbuterol, drostanolone and meldonium, and again for tampering.

=== ONE Friday Fights 95 ===
On 5 March 2025 it was announced that Nabati failed a drug test after testing positive for drostanolone, modafinil and meldonium, prior to ONE Friday Fights 95. He was suspended by ONE Championship for 1 year.

== Championships and accomplishments ==
=== Professional ===
- Fair Fight
  - 2022 Fair Fight Featherweight (-65 kg) Tournament Winner
  - 2022 Fair Fight Featherweight (-65 kg) Championship
    - Two successful title defenses

=== Amateur ===
- Russian Muaythai Federation
  - 5x Russian Muaythai Cup Winner (2011-2015)
  - (gold) 2014 Russian Muaythai Championships (-60 kg)
  - (gold) 2016 Russian Muaythai Championships (-60 kg)
  - (gold) 2019 Russian Muaythai Championships (-63.5 kg)
  - (gold) 2021 Russian Muaythai Championships (-67 kg)
- International Federation of Muaythai Associations
  - (gold) 2010 IFMA World Championship Junior (-45 kg)
  - (gold) 2011 IFMA European Championship Junior (-48 kg)
  - (silver) 2013 IFMA European Championships (-57 kg)
  - (bronze) 2014 IFMA World Championships (-60 kg)
  - (silver) 2015 IFMA Royal World Cup (-60 kg)
  - (gold) 2016 IFMA World Cup in Kazan (-60 kg)

== Mixed martial arts record ==
Professional record breakdown
1 match	1 win	0 losses
By knockout	1	0
By submission	0	0
By decision	0	0

Res.	Record	Opponent	Method	Event	Date	Round	Time	Location	Notes
Win	1–0	Valery Abramenko	TKO (punches)	Strike Fighting Championship 1	1 May 2019	1	2:22	Antalya, Turkey	

== Kickboxing and Muay Thai record ==
Kickboxing and muay thai record
23 Wins (8 (T)KO's), 1 Loss, 0 Draw, 1 No Contests
Date	Result	Opponent	Event	Location	Method	Round	Time
2026-09-11	Win	(Thailand) Nontachai Jitmuangnon	ONE The Inner Circle 31, Lumpinee Stadium	Bangkok, Thailand	Decision (unanimous)	3	3:00
2026-05-22	Loss	(Thailand) Yod-IQ Or.Pimolsri	ONE Friday Fights 155, Lumpinee Stadium	Bangkok, Thailand	Decision (split)	3	3:00
2025-01-31	NC	(Thailand) Ferrari Fairtex	ONE Friday Fights 95, Lumpinee Stadium	Bangkok, Thailand	NC (overturned)	1	1:56
Performance of the Night. Originally a KO (punch) win for Nabati; overturned after both fighters tested positive for banned substances.
2024-09-27	Win	(Thailand) Nong-O Gaiyanghadao	ONE Friday Fights 81, Lumpinee Stadium	Bangkok, Thailand	Decision (unanimous)	3	3:00
2024-06-28	Win	(Thailand) Suablack Tor.Pran49	ONE Friday Fights 68, Lumpinee Stadium	Bangkok, Thailand	KO (left hook)	1	1:54
2024-03-15	Win	(Thailand) Avatar Tor.Morsri	ONE Friday Fights 55, Lumpinee Stadium	Bangkok, Thailand	Decision (unanimous)	3	3:00
2023-09-29	Win	(Thailand) Pongsiri P.K.Saenchaimuaythaigym	ONE Friday Fights 35, Lumpinee Stadium	Bangkok, Thailand	Decision (unanimous)	3	3:00
2023-08-18	Win	(Cambodia) Phal Sophorn	RCC Fair Fight 22	Yekaterinburg, Russia	KO (spinning heel kick)	1	1:13
2023-06-10	Win	(China) Meng Gaofeng	RCC Fair Fight 21	Yekaterinburg, Russia	Decision (unanimous)	5	3:00
Defends the Fair Fight Featherweight (-65kg) title.
2023-02-18	Win	(Thailand) Suablack Tor.Pran49	RCC Fair Fight 20	Yekaterinburg, Russia	KO (knee to the head)	1	0:29
2022-11-26	Win	(Russia) Andrey Kromov	RCC Fair Fight 19	Yekaterinburg, Russia	Decision (unanimous)	5	3:00
Defends the Fair Fight Featherweight (-65kg) title.
2022-07-15	Win	(Russia) Kirill Khomutov	Fair Fight 18 - Championship Tournament, Final	Yekaterinburg, Russia	Decision (unanimous)	3	3:00
Won the vacant Fair Fight Featherweight (-65kg) title.
2022-07-15	Win	(Russia) Said Asatov	Fair Fight 18 - Championship Tournament, Semifinal	Yekaterinburg, Russia	Decision (unanimous)	3	3:00
2022-03-26	Win	(Thailand) Chaichan Petch Por.Tor.Aor.	Muay Hardcore	Bangkok, Thailand	Decision	3	3:00
2022-02-12	Win	(Uzbekistan) Mavlud Tupiev	Fair Fight 16	Yekaterinburg, Russia	Decision (unanimous)	3	3:00
2021-08-28	Win	(Belarus) Maxim Petkevich	Fair Fight 15	Yekaterinburg, Russia	Decision (unanimous)	3	3:00
2019-07-21	Win	(Thailand) Chatchai Sungmao	Muay Thai Night 5	Moscow, Russia	Decision (unanimous)	3	3:00
2018-11-30	Win	(Spain) Yassin Cheddi	KOK World Series in Spain	Valencia, Spain	KO (spinning heel kick)	3	
2018-09-23	Win	(Russia) Alexander Lepikhov	Russian Challenge 5	Moscow, Russia	Decision (unanimous)	3	3:00
2017-12-26	Win	(Malaysia) Fahsi KingkaMuayThai	Rawai Boxing Stadium	Phuket, Thailand	TKO (retirement)	3	3:00
2017-03-31	Win	(Russia) Hashid Sariev	WHMC 2 Generation	Grozny, Russia	TKO	3	
2017-01-16	Win	(Thailand)	Max Muaythai	Bangkok, Thailand	KO	2	
2016-12-24	Win	(Russia) Sharif Mazoriev	WHMC 1	Grozny, Russia	Decision (unanimous)	5	3:00
2015-09-17	Win	(Thailand) Kromsappasamit Jaotalai	THAI FIGHT Moscow	Moscow, Russia	Decision (unanimous)	5	3:00
Legend: Win Loss Draw/No contest Notes

Amateur muay thai record
Date	Result	Opponent	Event	Location	Method	Round	Time
2021-10-15	Win	(Russia) Ilya Musaev	2021 Russian Championships, Tournament Final	Nizhny Novgorod, Russia	Decision (unanimous)	3	3:00
Won the 2021 Russian Championships -67 kg Gold Medal.
2021-10-14	Win	(Russia) Artur Khairullin	2021 Russian Championships, Tournament Semifinal	Nizhny Novgorod, Russia	Decision (unanimous)	3	3:00
2021-10-13	Win	(Russia) Vusal Mardanov	2021 Russian Championships, Tournament Quarterfinal	Nizhny Novgorod, Russia	Decision (unanimous)	3	3:00
2021-10-12	Win	(Russia) Ilya Ketov	2021 Russian Championships, Tournament Opening Round	Nizhny Novgorod, Russia	Decision (unanimous)	3	3:00
2019-09-13	Win	(Russia) Abdulmalik Mugidinov	2019 Russian Championships, Tournament Final	Perm, Russia	Decision (unanimous)	3	3:00
Won the 2019 Russian Championships -63.5 kg Gold Medal.
2016-11-27	Win	(Turkey) Arslan Murat	2016 IFMA World Cup, Tournament Final	Kazan, Russia	Walk over		
Won the 2016 IFMA World Cup in Kazan -60 kg Gold Medal.
2016-11-	Win		2016 IFMA World Cup, Tournament Semifinal	Kazan, Russia			
2016-11-	Win	(Afghanistan) Mirzai Salman	2016 IFMA World Cup, Tournament Quarterfinal	Kazan, Russia	Decision	3	3:00
2016-07-17	Win	(Russia) Sharif Mazoriev	2016 Russian Championships, Tournament Final	Moscow, Russia	Decision (unanimous)	3	3:00
Won the 2016 Russian Championships -60 kg Gold Medal.
2016-07-16	Win	(Russia) Magomed-Ali Amerkhanov	2016 Russian Championships, Tournament Semifinal	Moscow, Russia	Decision (unanimous)	3	3:00
2016-07-15	Win	(Russia) Alexey Koslev	2016 Russian Championships, Tournament Quarterfinal	Moscow, Russia	Decision (unanimous)	3	3:00
2015-08-	Loss	(Thailand) Ruthaiphan Sapmanee	2015 IFMA World Championships, Final	Bangkok, Thailand	Decision	3	3:00
Won the 2015 IFMA World Championships -60 kg Silver Medal.
2015-08-22	Win	(New Zealand) Chris Wells	2015 IFMA World Championships, Semifinal	Bangkok, Thailand	Decision	3	3:00
2015-08-	Win	(Finland) Timo-Juhani Venalainen	2015 IFMA World Championships, Quarterfinal	Bangkok, Thailand	TKO	1	
2015-03-22	Win	(Russia) Pavel Kuznetsov	2015 Russian Championships, Tournament Final	Kaliningrad, Russia	Decision (unanimous)	3	3:00
Won the 2015 Russian Championships -60 kg Gold Medal.
2014-05-	Loss	(Thailand) Suwat Thoetkiat	2014 IFMA World Championships, Semifinals	Langkawi, Malaysia	Decision	3	3:00
Won the 2014 IFMA World Championships -60 kg Bronze Medal.
2014-05-	Win	(Ukraine) Mykhailo Vasylioglo	2014 IFMA World Championships, Quarterfinals	Langkawi, Malaysia	Decision	3	3:00
2014-05-	Win	(Mongolia) Bat-Erden Namjilmaa	2014 IFMA World Championships, First Round	Langkawi, Malaysia	Decision	3	3:00
2014-03-17	Win	(Russia) Maxim Ramazanov	2014 Russian Championships, Tournament Final	Sevastopol, Russia	Decision (unanimous)	3	3:00
Won the 2014 Russian Championships -60 kg Gold Medal.
2013-07-28	Loss	(Ukraine) Konstantin Trishin	2013 IFMA European Championships, Tournament Final	Lisbon, Portugal	Decision	3	3:00
Won the 2013 European Championships -57 kg Silver Medal.
2013-03-	Win	(Russia)	2013 Russian Championships, Tournament Final	Irkutsk, Russia	Decision	3	3:00
Won the 2013 Russian Championships -57 kg Gold Medal.
2013-03-	Win	(Russia) Stanislav Gavrilov	2013 Russian Championships, Tournament Semifinal	Irkutsk, Russia	Decision	3	3:00
2012-06-29	Win	(Russia) Vasily Zherebtsov	2012 Russian Championships, Tournament Final	Moscow, Russia	Decision	3	3:00
Won the 2012 Russian Championships -54 kg Gold Medal.
2012-05-	Loss	(Ukraine) Denis Butch	2012 IFMA European Championships, Tournament Quarterfinal	Antalya, Turkey	Decision	3	3:00
2011-04-	Win	(Ukraine)	2011 IFMA European Championships, Tournament Final	Antalya, Turkey	Decision	3	2:00
Wins 2011 IFMA European Championships Junior -48kg Gold Medal.
2010-12-	Win	(Kazakhstan) Abdulgalyev	2010 IFMA World Championships, Tournament Final	Bangkok, Thailand	Decision	3	2:00
Wins 2010 IFMA World Championships Junior -45kg Gold Medal.
Legend: Win Loss Draw/No contest Notes

== See also ==
- List of male kickboxers
