= Sibmuen Sitchefboontham =

Thai Muay Thai kickboxer

Sibmean
- Born: 1995 (age 30–31); Nakhon Ratchasima province, Thailand
- Other names: Sibmuen Chuwattana
- Nationality: Thai
- Height: 1.78 m (5 ft 10 in)
- Weight: 69.9 kg (154 lb; 11.01 st)
- Division: Welterweight
- Reach: 71 in (180 cm)
- Style: Muay Thai
- Stance: Southpaw
- Fighting out of: Bangkok, Thailand
- Team: Chuwattana; Sitchefboontham

Other information

YouTube information
- Channel: Coach Nay – สิบหมื่น
- Years active: 2019–present
- Genre: Vlog
- Subscribers: 2.04 million
- Last updated: 20 May 2024

Sibmean Sitchefboontham (Thai: สิบหมื่น ศิษย์เชฟบุญธรรม), is a Thai Muay Thai fighter.

== Career ==
On May 25, 2017 Sibmuen challenged Takuya Imamura for his Rajadamnern Stadium 154 lbs title. He won the fight by decision.

On November 30, 2017 Sibmuen faced Buakiew Sitsongpeenong at the Omnoi Stadium. He was defeated by decision.

On February 19, 2018 Sibmuen lost his Rajadamnern Stadium 154 lbs title to Inthachai Chor.Hapayak by decision.

On June 27, 2018 Sibmuen faced Tsukuru Midorikawa for the vacant Rajadamnern Stadium 154 lbs title. He won the fight by decision.

On September 19, 2018 Sibmuen faced Buakiew Sitsongpeenong at Rajadamnern Stadium. He won the fight by knockout from knees to the body in round 4.

On February 17, 2019 Sibmuen challenged Hinata for his REBELS 154 lbs title in Tokyo, Japan. He lost the fight by knockout due to low kicks in the third round

Following the covid crisis Sibmuen went away from competition to go back working with his father. During the same period he started documenting his career on his youtube channel and reached over 1.5 million subscribers in two years. In 2022 he made his return to competition for a celebrity fighting show where he defeated former Rajadamnern champion Jos Mendonca by unanimous decision.

Sibmuen took part in the 2022 Rajadamnern World Series in the welterweight division. He won his first group stage fight by knockout against Mohamed Cheboub.

== Titles and accomplishments ==
- Rajadamnern Stadium
  - 2017 Rajadamnern Stadium 154 lbs Champion
  - 2018 Rajadamnern Stadium 154 lbs Champion
  - 2022 Rajadamnern World Series 147 lbs Runner-up
- Omnoi Stadium
  - 2015 Omnoi Stadium 147 lbs Champion (one defense)

== Muay Thai record ==
Muay Thai record
78 Wins (26 (T)KO's), 26 Losses, 2 Draws
Date	Result	Opponent	Event	Location	Method	Round	Time
2024-12-20	Loss	(Russia) Abdulla Dayakaev	ONE Friday Fights 92, Lumpinee Stadium	Bangkok, Thailand	KO (Left hook)	1	0:35
2024-06-28	Loss	(Australia) Tyson Harrison	ONE Friday Fights 68, Lumpinee Stadium	Bangkok, Thailand	Decision (Split)	3	3:00
2023-09-22	Loss	(Portugal) Miguel Trindade	ONE Friday Fights 34, Lumpinee Stadium	Bangkok, Thailand	KO (Left hook to the body)	1	2:14
2022-12-16	Loss	(Thailand) Shadow Singmawynn	Rajadamnern World Series – Final	Bangkok, Thailand	Decision (Unanimous)	5	3:00
For the Rajadamnern World Series Welterweight title.
2022-11-04	Win	(Thailand) Mangkornkaw Sit Kaewprapon	Rajadamnern World Series – Semi Final	Bangkok, Thailand	Decision (Unanimous)	3	3:00
2022-09-30	Win	(Thailand) Yodkhunpon Sitmonchai	Rajadamnern World Series – Group Stage	Bangkok, Thailand	Decision (Unanimous)	3	3:00
2022-08-26	Win	(Algeria) Amrane Sor.Suwannaran	Rajadamnern World Series – Group Stage	Bangkok, Thailand	KO (Middle kick)	1	0:59
2022-07-22	Win	(Algeria) Mohamed Cheboub	Rajadamnern World Series – Group Stage	Bangkok, Thailand	KO (Left elbow)	1	
2022-04-02	Win	(Brazil) Jos Mendonca	Idol Fight 2	Bangkok, Thailand	Decision (Unanimous)	3	3:00
2019-06-22	Win	(Cambodia) Roeung Sophorn		Cambodia	Decision	5	3:00
2019-05-31	Win	(Cambodia) Meun Sophea	Bayon TV	Cambodia	Decision	5	3:00
2019-02-17	Loss	(Japan) Hinata	PANCRASE REBELS RING.1	Tokyo, Japan	KO (Low Kicks)	3	0:26
For the REBELS −154 lbs title.
2018-12-19	Win	(Thailand) Konluang Pumpanmuang	Rajadamnern Stadium	Bangkok, Thailand	KO (Left Elbow)	3	
2018-10-11	Draw	(Thailand) Rungrat Pumpanmuang	Rajadamnern Stadium	Bangkok, Thailand	Decision	5	3:00
2018-09-19	Win	(Thailand) Buakiew Sitsongpeenong	Rajadamnern Stadium	Bangkok, Thailand	KO (Knees)	4	
2018-08-15	Win	(Thailand) Noppakao Gor.Geysanon	Rajadamnern Stadium	Bangkok, Thailand	KO (Body Kick)	4	
2018-06-27	Win	(Japan) Tsukuru Midorikawa	Rajadamnern Stadium	Bangkok, Thailand	Decision	5	3:00
Wins the vacant Rajadamnern Stadium −154 lbs title.
2018-05-21	Win	(Romania) Alex Bublea	All Star Fight 4	Hong Kong	Decision	3	3:00
2018-04-28	Win	(Brazil) Luis Cajaiba	All Star Fight 3	Bangkok, Thailand	Decision	5	3:00
2018-02-19	Loss	(Thailand) Inthachai Chor.Hapayak	Rajadamnern Stadium	Bangkok, Thailand	Decision	5	3:00
Loses Rajadamnern Stadium −154 lbs title.
2018-01-17	Win	(Thailand) Buakiew Sitsongpeenong	Rajadamnern Stadium	Bangkok, Thailand	KO (Left Elbow)	3	
2017-11-30	Loss	(Thailand) Buakiew Sitsongpeenong	Rajadamnern Stadium	Bangkok, Thailand	Decision	5	3:00
2017-09-30	Win	(Belarus) Andrei Kulebin	All Star Fight 2	Bangkok, Thailand	Decision	3	3:00
2017-09-07	Win	(Thailand) Jojo 13coinresort	Rajadamnern Stadium	Bangkok, Thailand	Decision	5	3:00
2017-07-20	Win	(Thailand) Monsiam Lukmuangphet	Rajadamnern Stadium	Bangkok, Thailand	Decision	5	3:00
2017-05-25	Win	(Japan) Takuya "T-98" Imamura	Rajadamnern Stadium	Bangkok, Thailand	Decision	5	3:00
Wins Rajadamnern Stadium −154 lbs title.
2016-10-23	Draw	(Japan) Tsukuru Midorikawa	SNKA MAGNUM 42	Tokyo, Japan	Decision	5	3:00
2016-07-30	Loss	(Thailand) Phayaluang Flukbamikiew	Omnoi Stadium	Samut Sakhon, Thailand	Decision	5	3:00
2016-07-09	Win	(Thailand) Navee J-Powerroof Puket	Omnoi Stadium	Samut Sakhon, Thailand	Decision	5	3:00
2016-03-26	Win	(France) Rafi Bohic	Omnoi Stadium	Samut Sakhon, Thailand	TKO (Doctor Stoppage)	4	
Denfends Omnoi Stadium 147 lbs title.
2016-02-07	Loss	(Thailand) Phonek Or.Kwanmuang	Rajadamnern Stadium	Bangkok, Thailand	KO	3	
2016-01-17	Win	(Thailand) Navee J-Powerroof Puket	Rajadamnern Stadium	Bangkok, Thailand	Decision	5	3:00
2015-12-27	Win	(Thailand) Manachai YokkaoSaenchaigym	Rajadamnern Stadium	Bangkok, Thailand	Decision	5	3:00
2015-10-25	Win	(Thailand) Phosailek Pakornpronsurin	Rajadamnern Stadium	Bangkok, Thailand	KO	2	
2015-09-05	Win	(Iran) Vahik Sangmorakot	Omnoi Stadium	Samut Sakhon, Thailand	Decision	5	3:00
Wins the vacant Omnoi Stadium 147 lbs title.
2015-06-17	Loss	(Thailand) Mafiadam Tor.PhranThaksin	Rajadamnern Stadium	Bangkok, Thailand	Decision	5	3:00
2015-06-04	Loss	(Thailand) Phetmakok Sitdabmai	Omnoi Stadium	Samut Sakhon, Thailand	Decision	5	3:00
2015-04-27	Loss	(Thailand) Phonek Or.Kwanmuang	Rajadamnern Stadium	Bangkok, Thailand	Decision	5	3:00
2015-03-08	Win	(Thailand) Jaknaronglek Sor.Julsen	Rajadamnern Stadium	Bangkok, Thailand	Decision	5	3:00
2015-02-15	Win	(Thailand) Taythonglek Phetsaitong	Rajadamnern Stadium	Bangkok, Thailand	KO	4	
2015-01-11	Win	(Thailand) Saphanpetch Sititisukto	Rajadamnern Stadium	Bangkok, Thailand	Decision	5	3:00
2014-12-25	Loss	(Thailand) Kongdanai Sor.Sommai	Rajadamnern Stadium	Bangkok, Thailand	Decision	5	3:00
2014-10-22	Loss	(Thailand) Pehtboonchu Sor.Sommai	Rajadamnern Stadium	Bangkok, Thailand	KO	4	
Legend: Win Loss Draw/No contest Notes
