= Rola Khaled =

Lebanese female Muaythai practitioner (born 1984)

- Born: January 1, 1984 (age 42)
- Nationality: Lebanese

Rola Khaled (born 1 January 1984) is a Lebanese female Muaythai practitioner. She also competed at the Asian Beach Games in 2014 and 2016, claiming silver medals each in the women's 60 kg featherweight event and women's 63.5 kg light welterweight event.

Rola also represented Lebanon at the 2017 Asian Indoor and Martial Arts Games and clinched a bronze medal in the women's 63.5 kg event.
