= Philippines at the 2014 Asian Beach Games =

- IOC code: PHI
- NOC: Philippine Olympic Committee
- Website: www.olympic.ph (in English)

in Phuket
- Competitors: 80 (52 men & 28 women) in 16 sports
- Officials: 24
- Medals Ranked 14th: Gold 3 Silver 2 Bronze 7 Total 12

Asian Beach Games appearances
- 2008; 2010; 2012; 2014; 2016; 2026

Philippines participated in the 2014 Asian Beach Games in Phuket, Thailand from 14 to 23 November 2014. Maybelline Masuda clinched Philippines' first Asian Beach Games Gold Medal in Women's –50 kg Ju-jitsu. Annie Ramirez immediately followed with another gold copping the Women's –60 kg Ju-jitsu.

Philippines ended their campaign with 3 gold medals, 2 silver medals, 7 bronze medals and a total of 12 medals, finishing fourteenth on the medal table. The Philippines Team achieved its best finish since the start of the Beach Games.

== Medalists ==
=== Gold ===
No.	Medal	Name	Sport	Event	Date
1	Gold	Maybelline Masuda	Ju-jitsu	Women –50kg	13 Nov
2	Gold	Annie Ramirez	Ju-jitsu	Women –60kg	13 Nov
3	Gold	Geylord Coveta	Sailing	RS One Men	20 Nov

=== Silver ===
No.	Medal	Name	Sport	Event	Date
1	Silver	Susan Madelene Larsson	Water skiing	Women's Cable Wakeskate	16 Nov
2	Silver	Phillip Delarmino	Muay Thai	Men's 54kg	22 Nov

=== Bronze ===
No.	Medal	Name	Sport	Event	Date
1	Bronze	John Baylon	Ju-jitsu	Men –80kg	12 Nov
2	Bronze	Robeno Javier	Triathlon	Men's Duathlon	15 Nov
3	Bronze	Jose Vicente Cembrano	Water skiing	Men's Cable Wakeskate	16 Nov
4	Bronze	Susan Madelene Larsson; Jose Vicente Cembrano	Water skiing	Women's Team Cable Wakeskate	18 Nov
5	Bronze	Manuel Delos Reyes	Muay Thai	Men's 51kg	21 Nov
6	Bronze	Alvin Berto	Muay Thai	Men's 60kg	21 Nov
7	Bronze	Joel Zaspa	Muay Thai	Men's 75kg	21 Nov

=== Multiple ===
Name	Sport	Gold	Silver	Bronze	Total
Susan Madelene Larsson	Water skiing	0	1	1	2
Jose Vicente Cembrano	Water skiing	0	0	2	2

== Medal summary ==
=== By sports ===
Sport	1st place, gold medalist(s)	2nd place, silver medalist(s)	3rd place, bronze medalist(s)	Total
Ju-Jitsu	2	0	1	3
Muay Thai	0	1	3	4
Sailing	1	0	0	1
Triathlon	0	0	1	1
Water skiing	0	1	2	3
Total	3	2	7	12

=== By date ===
Medals by date
Day	Date	1st place, gold medalist(s)	2nd place, silver medalist(s)	3rd place, bronze medalist(s)	Total
–1	12 Nov	0	0	1	1
0	13 Nov	2	0	0	2
1	14 Nov	0	0	0	0
2	15 Nov	0	0	1	1
3	16 Nov	0	1	1	2
4	17 Nov	0	0	0	0
5	18 Nov	0	0	1	1
6	19 Nov	0	0	0	0
7	20 Nov	1	0	0	1
8	21 Nov	0	0	3	3
9	22 Nov	0	1	0	1
10	23 Nov	0	0	0	0
Total		3	2	7	12

== Air Sports ==
Athlete	Event	Tasks								Total	Rank
Athlete	Event	1	2	3	4	5	6	7	8	Total	Rank
Randell Raymundo	Individual Precision	30	2	13	2	2	20	—N/a	2	71	27th
Randell Raymundo	Individual Economy	2	14	2	—N/a					18	20th
Randell Raymundo	Team	—N/a									20th
Randell Raymundo	All-Around Over-all	—N/a									28th

== Beach Basketball ==
=== Women's 3-on-3 Basketball ===
Team	Pld	W	L	PF	PA	PD	Pts
China	3	3	0	55	38	+17	6
Mongolia	3	2	1	46	41	+5	5
Philippines	3	1	2	37	42	-5	4
India	3	0	3	35	52	-17	3

November 15
10:40

Philippines	13–11	India
Pts: Galicia 7		Pts: Rajaganapathi 4

Karon North 1, Phuket

November 16
10:40

Philippines	11–12	Mongolia
Pts: 3 tied for 3		Pts: 2 tied for 5

Karon North 1, Phuket

November 17
10:40

Philippines	13–19	China
Pts: Galicia 5		Pts: Huang 10

Karon North 1, Phuket

Final Rank

5th Place

== Beach Flag Football ==
=== Preliminary round ===
Team	Pld	W	D	L	PF	PA	PD	Pts
Thailand	5	5	0	0	297	125	+172	15
Japan	5	4	0	1	248	119	+129	12
Kuwait	5	3	0	2	233	146	+87	9
China	5	2	0	3	209	227	−18	6
Philippines	5	1	0	4	122	215	−93	3
India	5	0	0	5	76	353	−277	0

November 12; 10:00	Philippines	26 – 32	China	Saphan Hin, Phuket
November 12; 10:00		(14–24)		Saphan Hin, Phuket

November 12; 13:00	Japan	61 – 6	Philippines	Saphan Hin, Phuket
November 12; 13:00		(34–6)		Saphan Hin, Phuket

November 12; 15:00	Philippines	12 – 41	Kuwait	Saphan Hin, Phuket
November 12; 15:00		(0–16)		Saphan Hin, Phuket

November 13; 8:00	Philippines	24 – 67	Thailand	Saphan Hin, Phuket
November 13; 8:00		(18–41)		Saphan Hin, Phuket

November 13; 12:00	India	14 – 54	Philippines	Saphan Hin, Phuket
November 13; 12:00		(12–30)		Saphan Hin, Phuket

== Beach Handball ==
=== Women's Beach Handball ===
Team	Pld	W	L	SF	SA	Pts
Chinese Taipei	4	4	0	8	0	8
Vietnam	4	3	1	6	2	6
Jordan	4	2	2	4	5	4
Turkmenistan	4	1	3	3	7	2
Philippines	4	0	4	1	8	0

Date		Score		Set 1	Set 2	Set 3
15 Nov	Philippines	0–2	Jordan	8–15	12–15	
17 Nov	Vietnam	2–0	Philippines	17–8	24–3	
18 Nov	Philippines	0–2	Chinese Taipei	8–11	6–24	
19 Nov	Philippines	1–2	Turkmenistan	15–10	5–10	9–11

==== Placement 9th–10th ====
Date		Score		Set 1	Set 2	Set 3
20 Nov	Philippines	2–0	India	18–10	14–9	

== Beach Modern Pentathlon ==
Athlete	Event	Final	
Athlete	Event	Total	Rank
John Leerams Chicano	Men's Individual	20:22	6th
Marion Kim Mangrobang	Women's Individual	21:57	5th
Marion Kim Mangrobang; John Leerams Chicano	Mixed Team Relay	19:53	8th

== Beach Volleyball ==
=== Pool F ===
Pos	Team	Pld	W	L	Pts	SW	SL	SR	SPW	SPL	SPR
1	Rachmawan–Darkuncoro (INA)	5	5	0	10	10	0	MAX	210	106	1.981
2	Wong–Chui (HKG)	5	4	1	9	8	2	4.000	213	146	1.459
3	Bonono–Ybanez (PHI)	5	3	2	8	6	4	1.500	202	147	1.374
4	Razzaq–Raza (PAK)	5	2	3	7	4	6	0.667	168	151	1.113
5	Abdul Hameed–Nihad (MDV)	5	1	4	1	2	8	0.250	135	168	0.804
6	Al-Arqan–Tafesh (PLE)	5	0	5	5	0	10	0.000	0	0	—

Source: AVC

Date		Score		Set 1	Set 2	Set 3
16 Nov	Bonono–Ybanez (PHI)	2–0	Abdul Hameed–Nihad (MDV)	21–9	21–12	
16 Nov	Wong–Chui (HKG)	2–0	Bonono–Ybanez (PHI)	21–16	33–31	
17 Nov	Bonono–Ybanez (PHI)	2–0	Al-Arqan–Tafesh (PLE)	Walkover		
18 Nov	Rachmawan–Darkuncoro (INA)	2–0	Bonono–Ybanez (PHI)	21–15	21–13	
19 Nov	Bonono–Ybanez (PHI)	2–0	Razzaq–Raza (PAK)	21–10	22–20	

=== Pool G ===
Pos	Team	Pld	W	L	Pts	SW	SL	SR	SPW	SPL	SPR
1	Li–Zhang (CHN)	5	5	0	10	10	0	MAX	210	140	1.500
2	Becaldo–Tipgos (PHI)	5	4	1	9	8	5	1.600	221	216	1.023
3	Santosa–Fahriansyah (INA)	5	3	2	8	7	5	1.400	215	198	1.086
4	Yapa–Weliweriya (SRI)	5	2	3	7	5	6	0.833	198	195	1.015
5	Al-Subhi–Al-Hashmi (OMA)	5	1	4	6	4	8	0.500	195	217	0.899
6	Nuryýew–Atajanow (TKM)	5	0	5	5	0	10	0.000	140	213	0.657

Source: AVC

Date		Score		Set 1	Set 2	Set 3
16 Nov	Becaldo–Tipgos (PHI)	2–1	Al-Subhi–Al-Hashmi (OMA)	16–21	21–13	15–11
17 Nov	Becaldo–Tipgos (PHI)	2–0	Nuriyev–Atajanov (TKM)	21–16	21–16	
17 Nov	Santosa–Fahriansyah (INA)	1–2	Becaldo–Tipgos (PHI)	13–21	21–13	14–16
18 Nov	Li–Zhang (CHN)	2–0	Becaldo–Tipgos (PHI)	21–15	21–15	
19 Nov	Becaldo–Tipgos (PHI)	2–1	Yapa–Weliweriya (SRI)	21–17	11–21	15–11

=== Knockout round ===
Round of 32
Date		Score		Set 1	Set 2	Set 3
20 Nov	Becaldo–Tipgos (PHI)	2–1	Juan–Wang (TPE)	19–21	21–19	15–13
20 Nov	Hasegawa–Ageba (JPN)	2–1	Bonono–Ybanez (PHI)	19–21	21–14	15–11
Round of 16
Date		Score		Set 1	Set 2	Set 3
21 Nov	Becaldo–Tipgos (PHI)	1-2	Sangkhachot–Inkiew (THA)	13–21	16–21	

== Beach Wrestling ==
Athlete	Event	Round Robin		Semifinals	Final	Rank
Athlete	Event	Opponent Score	Rank	Opponent Score	Opponent Score	Rank
Joseph Angana	Men's Freestyle -70kg	Ba Phuong Phan (VIE); W 2-0; Padipat Wantawong (THA); L 1-2; Elsuior Erik Uulu (KGZ); W 2-1	2	Did Not Advance		7th
Smael Trazona	Men's Freestyle -80kg	Husnul Amri (INA); L 0-2; Sheikh Shepon (BAN); L 0-2; Didar Bayramow (TKM); L 1-2	4	Did Not Advance		13th
Jason Balbal	Men's Freestyle +80kg	Loeun Chap (CAM); W 2-0; Jafir KhanmKhan (QAT); L 0-2; Bekbolsun Kushubakov (KGZ); L 0-2	3	Did Not Advance		10th
Grace Loberanes	Women's Freestyle -50kg	Soumaly Phinith (LAO); W 2-0; Thi Xuan Nguyen (VIE); L 0-2; Heka Masa Semiring (INA); L 0-2; Hikaru Aono (JPN); L 0-2; Maliwan Muangpor (THA); W 2-1	5	Did Not Advance		5th
Efralyn Crosby	Women's Freestyle -60kg	Miruyert Dynbayeva (KAZ); L 0-2; Kanjana Thongkan (THA); L 0-2; Kim Kyeongeun (KOR); L 0-2	4	Did Not Advance		7th

== Extreme Sports ==
Athlete	Event	Preliminary		Final	
Athlete	Event	Points	Rank	Points	Rank
Armand Mariano	BMX Stunt Park	61.33	9th	62.33	9th
Paulo Diaz	BMX Stunt Park	65.33	8th	60.33	10th
Armand Mariano	BMX Park Best Technical	—N/a			4th
Paulo Diaz	BMX Park Best Technical	—N/a			8th
Renz Rhollieh Viaje	BMX Flatland	—N/a		86.33	4th

== Jet Ski ==
November 17

Athlete	Event	Motor 1		Motor 2		Motor 3		Total	
Athlete	Event	Rank	Pts	Rank	Pts	Rank	Pts	Pts	Rank
Billy Joseph Ang (PHI)	Runabout Stock	4	43	5	39	8	30	112	6th

== Ju-jitsu ==
Athlete	Event	Quarterfinals	Semifinals	Finals	
Athlete	Event	Opposition Result	Opposition Result	Opposition	Final Ranking
John Baylon	Men's -80kg	Saoud Alhammadi (UAE); W 99.0-2	Mohammad Mansooridavar (IRI); L 0-0.1	Sooknatee Soontra (THA); W 99.0-4	3rd place, bronze medalist(s)
Maybelline Masuda	Women's -50kg	Anh Hu Tha (VIE); W 99.0-0	Tatchapan Srisamer (THA); W 18-8	Le Thu Trang Dao (VIE); W 15.0-0	1st place, gold medalist(s)
Annie Ramirez	Women's -60kg	Thi Quynh Nguyen (VIE); W 99.0-2	Rushana Nurjanova (TKM); W 12.0-0	Onanong Saengsirichok (THA); W 99.0-0	1st place, gold medalist(s)

== Muay Thai ==
Athlete	Event	Quarterfinals	Semifinals	Finals	
Athlete	Event	Opposition Result	Opposition Result	Opposition	Final Ranking
Manuel Delos Reyes	Men's 51kg-Fly	Mohd Aidil Che Omar (MAS); W 5-0	Arnon Phonkrathok (THA); L 0-5	Did Not Advance	3rd place, bronze medalist(s)
Phillip Delarmino	Men's 54kg-Bantam	Sayed Aslamudin Amanulah (AFG); W RSCH R2 1:11	Ahmed Salam Murad Murad (IRQ); WO	Parin Luangpon (THA); L 1-4	2nd place, silver medalist(s)
Nino Rio Saoy	Men's 57kg-Feather	Mongkhon Artwichian (THA); L RET 2:01	Did Not Advance		
Alvin Berto	Men's 60kg-Light	Zhang Fang (CHN); W 3-2	Mirbek Sartkalmakov (KGZ); L 0-5	Did Not Advance	3rd place, bronze medalist(s)
Jonathan Polosan	Men's 63.5kg-Light Welter	Harish (IND); W RSCO R1 3:00	Bobirjon Tagaev (UZB); L 0-5	Did Not Advance	3rd place, bronze medalist(s)
Joel Zaspa	Men's 75kg-Middle	Kamlesh Dewangan (IND); W KOB R2 2:16	Hossein Karami (IRI); L 0-5	Did Not Advance	3rd place, bronze medalist(s)

RSCH = Referee Stop Contest Head Blows
WO = Walkover
RET = Retired
RSCO = Referee Stop Contest Outclassed
KOB = Knockout Body

== Pétanque ==
=== Mixed doubles ===
Team	Pld	W	L	SF	SA	Pts
Malaysia	4	4	0	52	18	8
Vietnam	4	3	1	39	25	6
Laos	4	2	2	48	32	4
Philippines	4	1	3	26	48	2
Turkmenistan	4	0	4	10	52	0

Date		Score	
15 Nov	Philippines	0–13	Vietnam
15 Nov	Philippines	13-9	Turkmenistan
15 Nov	Philippines	5–13	Laos
15 Nov	Philippines	8–13	Malaysia

== Squash ==
Athlete	Event	Round of 64	Round of 32	Round of 16	Quarterfinals	Semifinals	Final
Athlete	Event	Opposition Result	Opposition Result	Opposition Result	Opposition Result	Opposition Result	Opposition Result
Reymark Begornia	Men's Squash	Wong Chi Him (HKG); L 1-7, 5-7	Did Not Advance				
David Pelino	Men's Squash	Kush Kumar (IND); L 5-7, 2-7	Did Not Advance				

== Sailing ==
Athlete	Event	Race								Net Points	Total Points	Rank
Athlete	Event	1	2	3	4	5	6	7	8	Net Points	Total Points	Rank
Geylord Coveta	Men's RS:One	(5)	2	2	1	1	5	2	1	19	14	1st place, gold medalist(s)
Yancy Kaibigan	Men's RS:One	4	7	7	5	(9)	6	5	7	50	41	7th
Harold Madrigal	Men's RS:X	10	9	~~(12)~~	7	7	12	3	11	71	59	9th
Kendell Magmanlac	Men's RS:X	~~(14)~~	10	11	9	12	9	10	5	80	66	10th
Rubin Cruz Jr.	Men's Laser	3	4	9	8	9	~~(10)~~	7	5	55	45	6th
Richly Magsanay; Ridgely Balladares	Open Hobie 16	5	4	5	1	5	3	~~(6)~~	2	31	25	5th
Alaiza Belmonte	Women's Laser Radial	4	2	7	6	~~(8)~~	7	7	5	46	38	6th

== Triathlon ==
=== Duathlon ===
Athlete	Event	Run (5 km)		Trans 1		Bike (20 km)		Trans 2		Run (2.5 km)		Total	Rank
Athlete	Event	Time	Run Rank	Time	Transfer Rank	Time	Bike Rank	Time	Transfer Rank	Time	Run Rank	Total	Rank
Robeno Javier	Men's Duathlon	16:36	2	0:13	1	28:22	3	0:48	1	8:58	3	54:57	3rd place, bronze medalist(s)
Carlo Pedregosa	Men's Duathlon	16:58	5	0:13	1	30:21	8	0:54	8	9:03	4	57:29	6th
Mirasol Abad	Women's Duathlon	20:20	4	0:12	3	35:42	5	0:13	1	11:37	6	1:08:04	4th
Miscelle Gilbuena	Women's Duathlon	20:36	5	0:12	3	36:59	9	0:13	1	11:22	4	1:09:22	5th
Mirasol Abad; Miscelle Gilbuena; Jeric Buhian; Carlo Pedregosa	Mixed Duathlon	Did Not Start											

=== Triathlon ===
Athlete	Event	Swim		Trans 1		Bike		Trans 2		Run		Total	Rank
Athlete	Event	Time	Swim Rank	Time	Transfer Rank	Time	Bike Rank	Time	Transfer Rank	Time	Run Rank	Total	Rank
John Chicano	Men's Triathlon	11:26	29	0:42	30	32:41	27	0:27	38	19:09	26	1:04:25	27
Nikko Bryan Huelgas	Men's Triathlon	10:22	18	0:35	14	30:47	15	0:25	32	17:15	12	59:24	15
Victorija Deldio	Women's Triathlon	Did Not Start											
Kim Mangrobang	Women's Triathlon	10:35	13	0:41	12	34:20	9	0:18	2	22:07	12	1:08:01	10th
Kim Mangrobang; Edward Macalalad; Victorija Deldio; Nikko Bryan Huelgas	Mixed Triathlon	4:24; 4:27; 5:28; 4:51	—	0:37; 0:36; 0:45; 0:32	—	12:36; 11:31; 12:53; 11:26	—	0:20; 0:20; 0:22; 0:22	—	9:26; 7:19; 9:04; 7:19	—	1:44:38	7th
