= Triathlon at the 2014 Asian Beach Games =

- Venue: Naiyang Beach
- Dates: 15–17 November 2014

Triathlon and Duathlon competition at the 2014 Asian Beach Games was held in Phuket, Thailand from 15 to 17 November 2014 at Naiyang Beach, Phuket.

== Medalists ==
=== Duathlon ===
Event	Gold	Silver	Bronze
Men's sprint	Ryo Sueoka; Japan	Yuya Fukaura; Japan	Robeno Javier; Philippines
Women's sprint	Yurie Kato; Japan	Hoi Long; Macau	Fumika Matsumoto; Japan
Mixed relay	Japan; Fumika Matsumoto; Yuya Fukaura; Yurie Kato; Ryo Sueoka	Chinese Taipei; Chang Chia-chia; Hsieh Shen-yen; Huang Yu-yan; Hsu Pei-yen	Uzbekistan; Zukhra Vakhitova; Javohir Yunusov; Alina Khakimova; Shohrukh Yunusov

=== Triathlon ===
Event	Gold	Silver	Bronze
Men's sprint	Heo Min-ho; South Korea	Kim Ji-hwan; South Korea	Bai Faquan; China
Women's sprint	Ai Ueda; Japan	Yuka Sato; Japan	Wang Lianyuan; China
Mixed relay	Japan; Yuka Sato; Hirokatsu Tayama; Ai Ueda; Yuichi Hosoda	China; Zhong Mengying; Liu Chen; Xin Lingxi; Duan Zhengyu	Hong Kong; Hilda Choi; Perry Wong; Leanne Szeto; Wong Hui Wai

== Medal table ==
Rank	Nation	Gold	Silver	Bronze	Total
1	Japan (JPN)	5	2	1	8
2	South Korea (KOR)	1	1	0	2
3	China (CHN)	0	1	2	3
4	Chinese Taipei (TPE)	0	1	0	1
4	Macau (MAC)	0	1	0	1
6	Hong Kong (HKG)	0	0	1	1
6	Philippines (PHI)	0	0	1	1
6	Uzbekistan (UZB)	0	0	1	1
Totals (8 entries)		6	6	6	18

== Results ==
=== Duathlon ===
==== Men's sprint ====
15 November

Rank	Athlete	Time
1st place, gold medalist(s)	Ryo Sueoka (JPN)	54:20
2nd place, silver medalist(s)	Yuya Fukaura (JPN)	54:25
3rd place, bronze medalist(s)	Robeno Javier (PHI)	54:57
4	Jauhari Johan (INA)	56:00
5	Ayan Beisenbayev (KAZ)	56:30
6	Carlo Pedregosa (PHI)	57:29
7	Mohammad Hosseini (IRI)	59:18
8	Mohamed Al-Qais (BRN)	59:18
9	Sasan Malmir (IRI)	59:28
10	Shahrom Abdullah (MAS)	59:30
11	Dmitriy Zaytsev (UZB)	59:31
12	Anton Portnyagin (KAZ)	59:34
13	Kriangsak Wongloung (THA)	59:47
14	Hsu Pei-yen (TPE)	1:01:31
15	Hsieh Shen-yen (TPE)	1:01:33
16	Ilyosbek Yunusov (UZB)	1:01:56
17	Jason Loh (MAS)	1:02:15
18	Lam Wai Kit (SIN)	1:02:18
19	Nitinan Budsrikui (THA)	1:05:39
20	Youssef Nader (LIB)	1:07:01
21	Ku Lap Chon (MAC)	1:09:07
22	Tan Jiayu (SIN)	1:11:03
—	Abedalaziz Ishabi (JOR)	DSQ
—	Chong Chi Seak (MAC)	DSQ

==== Women's sprint ====
15 November

Rank	Athlete	Time
1st place, gold medalist(s)	Yurie Kato (JPN)	1:02:58
2nd place, silver medalist(s)	Hoi Long (MAC)	1:03:26
3rd place, bronze medalist(s)	Fumika Matsumoto (JPN)	1:04:40
4	Mirasol Abad (PHI)	1:08:04
5	Miscelle Gilbuena (PHI)	1:09:22
6	Zukhra Vakhitova (UZB)	1:10:05
7	Chang Shuwen (SIN)	1:10:38
8	Alina Khakimova (UZB)	1:11:01
9	Huang Yu-yan (TPE)	1:11:48
10	Chang Chia-chia (TPE)	1:11:54
11	Irene Chong (MAS)	1:13:44
12	Lei Cho Ieng (MAC)	1:15:20
13	Sara Ng (SIN)	1:16:28
14	Teoh Sue Ling (MAS)	1:16:32
15	Duangsuda Phonbun (THA)	1:17:23
16	Pattama Kongle (THA)	1:19:31
—	Leanne Szeto (HKG)	DNS
—	Wahyu Riyanti (INA)	DNS

==== Mixed relay ====
15 November

Rank	Team	Time
1st place, gold medalist(s)	Japan (JPN)	1:33:29
2nd place, silver medalist(s)	Chinese Taipei (TPE)	1:34:52
3rd place, bronze medalist(s)	Uzbekistan (UZB)	1:36:17
4	Thailand (THA)	1:36:50
5	Macau (MAC)	1:40:22
6	Malaysia (MAS)	1:41:12
7	Singapore (SIN)	1:43:38
—	Philippines (PHI)	DNF

=== Triathlon ===
==== Men's sprint ====
17 November

Rank	Athlete	Time
1st place, gold medalist(s)	Heo Min-ho (KOR)	54:10
2nd place, silver medalist(s)	Kim Ji-hwan (KOR)	54:20
3rd place, bronze medalist(s)	Bai Faquan (CHN)	54:28
4	Hirokatsu Tayama (JPN)	54:37
5	Valentin Meshcheryakov (KAZ)	55:00
6	Lawrence Fanous (JOR)	55:07
7	Chen Lin (CHN)	55:10
8	Perry Wong (HKG)	55:14
9	Yuichi Hosoda (JPN)	55:48
10	Law Leong Tim (HKG)	55:54
11	Temirlan Temirov (KAZ)	57:21
12	Shohrukh Yunusov (UZB)	57:30
13	Salman Teymouri (IRI)	59:06
14	Hsieh Shen-yen (TPE)	59:15
15	Nikko Huelgas (PHI)	59:24
16	Javohir Yunusov (UZB)	59:36
17	Gurudatta Gharat (IND)	59:50
18	Andy Wibowo (INA)	1:00:01
19	Rikigoro Shinozuka (MAS)	1:00:50
20	Ehsan Aminian (IRI)	1:01:34
21	Mohammad Chebat (SYR)	1:01:42
22	Hsu Pei-yen (TPE)	1:02:01
23	Jonathan Ma (SIN)	1:02:05
24	Lourembam Mahesh (IND)	1:02:32
25	Thanongsak Manchai (THA)	1:02:57
26	Bryce Chong (SIN)	1:02:57
27	John Chicano (PHI)	1:04:25
28	Chong Chi Seak (MAC)	1:04:37
29	Firas Al-Hmood (JOR)	1:06:15
30	Hamad Al-Mansoori (BRN)	1:06:18
31	Ku Lap Chon (MAC)	1:06:52
32	Chit Ko Ko (MYA)	1:07:08
33	Natthaphon Kesornphrom (THA)	1:07:42
34	Tika Ram Thapa (NEP)	1:08:28
35	Himal Tamata (NEP)	1:10:06
36	Abdulla Ali (BRN)	1:10:09
37	Aung Kyaw Htet (MYA)	1:10:34
—	Thiang Chong Yoong (MAS)	DNF
—	Nguyễn Phi Long (VIE)	DNS

==== Women's sprint ====
17 November

Rank	Athlete	Time
1st place, gold medalist(s)	Ai Ueda (JPN)	1:00:30
2nd place, silver medalist(s)	Yuka Sato (JPN)	1:00:56
3rd place, bronze medalist(s)	Wang Lianyuan (CHN)	1:01:06
4	Huang Yuting (CHN)	1:01:18
5	Hoi Long (MAC)	1:01:48
6	Kim Ji-yeon (KOR)	1:02:44
7	Chang Chia-chia (TPE)	1:04:51
8	Hilda Choi (HKG)	1:06:46
9	Huang Yu-yan (TPE)	1:06:53
10	Kim Mangrobang (PHI)	1:08:01
11	Ethel Lin (SIN)	1:08:31
12	Zukhra Vakhitova (UZB)	1:09:31
13	Irene Chong (MAS)	1:11:29
14	Sameera Al-Bitar (BRN)	1:13:26
15	Sanruthai Arunsiri (THA)	1:13:33
16	Lei Cho Ieng (MAC)	1:16:13
17	Nur Iman Nabilah (MAS)	1:16:21
18	Thoudam Sorojini Devi (IND)	1:17:51
19	Thaingi Tun (MYA)	1:18:28
20	Wahyu Riyanti (INA)	1:21:05
21	Ei Ei Thet (MYA)	1:21:10
—	Winona Howe (SIN)	DNF
—	Chenkhuan Nammala (THA)	DNF
—	Pooja Chaurushi (IND)	DNF
—	Victorija Deldio (PHI)	DNS

==== Mixed relay ====
17 November

Rank	Team	Time
1st place, gold medalist(s)	Japan (JPN)	1:32:24
2nd place, silver medalist(s)	China (CHN)	1:34:43
3rd place, bronze medalist(s)	Hong Kong (HKG)	1:34:56
4	South Korea (KOR)	1:35:29
5	Chinese Taipei (TPE)	1:38:57
6	Uzbekistan (UZB)	1:43:05
7	Philippines (PHI)	1:44:38
8	Singapore (SIN)	1:45:49
9	Macau (MAC)	1:48:42
10	Thailand (THA)	1:50:06
11	Malaysia (MAS)	1:51:46
