= BMX freestyle at the 2014 Asian Beach Games =

- Venue: Saphan Hin
- Dates: 17–20 November 2014

BMX freestyle (as part of Extreme sports) competition at the 2014 Asian Beach Games was held in Phuket, Thailand from 17 to 20 November 2014 at the Saphan Hin Sports Center, Phuket.

== Medalists ==
Event	Gold	Silver	Bronze
Big air	Cheng Chiao-hung; Chinese Taipei	Zhang Zhiyong; China	Rungrueang Phamee; Thailand
Flatland	Pakphum Poosa-art; Thailand	Sheikh Mohd Taslim; Malaysia	Worawee Srivichai; Thailand
Park	Kiattichai Wanitsakul; Thailand	Rungrueang Phamee; Thailand	Li Yun-yi; Chinese Taipei
Park best trick	Kiattichai Wanitsakul; Thailand	Rungrueang Phamee; Thailand	Cheng Chiao-hung; Chinese Taipei

== Medal table ==
Rank	Nation	Gold	Silver	Bronze	Total
1	Thailand (THA)	3	2	2	7
2	Chinese Taipei (TPE)	1	0	2	3
3	China (CHN)	0	1	0	1
3	Malaysia (MAS)	0	1	0	1
Totals (4 entries)		4	4	4	12

== Results ==
=== Big air ===
20 November

Rank	Athlete	Height
1st place, gold medalist(s)	Cheng Chiao-hung (TPE)	4.50
2nd place, silver medalist(s)	Zhang Zhiyong (CHN)	4.45
3rd place, bronze medalist(s)	Rungrueang Phamee (THA)	4.30
4	Lee Jong-ryun (KOR)	4.25
5	Suh Ik-joon (KOR)	4.10
6	Zafrin Shah Sabikin (MAS)	3.90
6	Nonthakon Inkhoksong (THA)	3.90
—	Li Yun-yi (TPE)	DNS
—	Hafiz Mat Hussin (MAS)	DNS

=== Flatland ===
18 November

Rank	Athlete	Score
1st place, gold medalist(s)	Pakphum Poosa-art (THA)	92.33
2nd place, silver medalist(s)	Sheikh Mohd Taslim (MAS)	91.33
3rd place, bronze medalist(s)	Worawee Srivichai (THA)	89.33
4	Renz Viaje (PHI)	86.33
5	Jiang Huangjie (CHN)	83.67
6	Lee Dong-ho (KOR)	81.00
7	Wu Jiajian (CHN)	80.00
8	Nurhazme Janis (MAS)	74.00
9	Hong Sung-jun (KOR)	73.33
—	Cheng Chiao-hung (TPE)	DNS
—	Li Yun-yi (TPE)	DNS

=== Park ===
17–18 November

Rank	Athlete	Prel.	Final
1st place, gold medalist(s)	Kiattichai Wanitsakul (THA)	86.67	86.00
2nd place, silver medalist(s)	Rungrueang Phamee (THA)	85.00	85.67
3rd place, bronze medalist(s)	Li Yun-yi (TPE)	78.00	83.67
4	Suh Ik-joon (KOR)	74.33	75.67
5	Cheng Chiao-hung (TPE)	71.67	75.67
6	Zhang Zhiyong (CHN)	74.33	75.33
7	Zafrin Shah Sabikin (MAS)	70.67	67.00
8	Choi Chang-yeol (KOR)	60.00	62.67
9	Armand Mariano (PHI)	61.33	62.33
10	Paulo Diaz (PHI)	65.33	60.33
11	Hafiz Mat Hussin (MAS)	59.67	57.67

=== Park best trick ===
19 November

Rank	Athlete
1st place, gold medalist(s)	Kiattichai Wanitsakul (THA)
2nd place, silver medalist(s)	Rungrueang Phamee (THA)
3rd place, bronze medalist(s)	Cheng Chiao-hung (TPE)
4	Armand Mariano (PHI)
5	Zhang Zhiyong (CHN)
6	Hafiz Mat Hussin (MAS)
7	Cho Song-hyeon (KOR)
8	Paulo Diaz (PHI)
9	Suh Ik-joon (KOR)
10	Zafrin Shah Sabikin (MAS)
11	Li Yun-yi (TPE)
