= Pétanque at the 2014 Asian Beach Games =

- Venue: Patong Beach
- Dates: 15–20 November 2014

Pétanque competition at the 2014 Asian Beach Games was held in Phuket, Thailand from 15 to 20 November 2014 at Patong Beach, Phuket.

== Medalists ==
=== Men ===
Event	Gold	Silver	Bronze
Shooting	Cheng Zhi Ming; Singapore	Bouadeng Vongvone; Laos	Vatchara Songma; Thailand
Shooting	Cheng Zhi Ming; Singapore	Bouadeng Vongvone; Laos	Trần Ngọc Kiệt; Vietnam
Singles	Suranath Phadungsap; Thailand	Hafizuddin Mat Daud; Malaysia	Vũ Khang Duy; Vietnam
Singles	Suranath Phadungsap; Thailand	Hafizuddin Mat Daud; Malaysia	Siphandone Sisouphone; Laos
Doubles	Thailand; Supan Thongphoo; Sarawut Sriboonpeng	Vietnam; Ngô Ron; Võ Minh Luân	Malaysia; Saiful Bahari Musmin; Nuzul Azwan Ahmad Termizi
Doubles	Thailand; Supan Thongphoo; Sarawut Sriboonpeng	Vietnam; Ngô Ron; Võ Minh Luân	Laos; Lar Nienmany; Souphachith Dasolinh
Triples	Vietnam; Cao Phú Thịnh; Lý Ngọc Tài; Nguyễn Xuân Lộc	Malaysia; Shaari Hassan; Zani Lisa Mohamed; Hakem Ahmad Saberi; Ahmad Safwan Safiin	Laos; Ounhuen Detsanghan; Soulasith Khamvongsa; Vansamay Neutsavath; Anousone Norouvanh
Triples	Vietnam; Cao Phú Thịnh; Lý Ngọc Tài; Nguyễn Xuân Lộc	Malaysia; Shaari Hassan; Zani Lisa Mohamed; Hakem Ahmad Saberi; Ahmad Safwan Safiin	Thailand; Titiphong Pasom; Thaloengkiat Phusa-at; Suksan Piachan; Thanakorn Sangkaew

=== Women ===
Event	Gold	Silver	Bronze
Shooting	Khoun Souksavat; Laos	Trần Lê Thanh Thảo; Vietnam	Nur Izzati Ismail; Singapore
Shooting	Khoun Souksavat; Laos	Trần Lê Thanh Thảo; Vietnam	Oranit Natmanee; Thailand
Singles	Wannida Rooyoo; Thailand	Manyvanh Souliya; Laos	Chaw Ei Thu; Myanmar
Singles	Wannida Rooyoo; Thailand	Manyvanh Souliya; Laos	Siti Zubaidah Abu Talib; Malaysia
Doubles	Thailand; Phantipha Wongchuvej; Thongsri Thamakord	Malaysia; Aribah Aida Hasan; Nurul Atiqah Abu Talib	China; Lü Lin; Chao Guijin
Doubles	Thailand; Phantipha Wongchuvej; Thongsri Thamakord	Malaysia; Aribah Aida Hasan; Nurul Atiqah Abu Talib	Laos; Kanlaya Vongpasert; Aly Sengchanphet
Triples	Thailand; Nantawan Fueangsanit; Aumpawan Suwannaphruk; Chularat Tanong; Nattaya Yoothong	Vietnam; Ngô Thị Huyền Trân; Nguyễn Thị Cẩm Duyên; Nguyễn Thị Hiền; Phạm Kim Huệ	Turkmenistan; Ýelena Gridçina; Natalýa Kulik; Tatýana Kulik; Natalýa Şatilowa
Triples	Thailand; Nantawan Fueangsanit; Aumpawan Suwannaphruk; Chularat Tanong; Nattaya Yoothong	Vietnam; Ngô Thị Huyền Trân; Nguyễn Thị Cẩm Duyên; Nguyễn Thị Hiền; Phạm Kim Huệ	Laos; Linda Keobolakoth; Souksakhone Meuandouangpanya; Bovilak Thepphakan; Chansamone Vongsavath

=== Mixed ===
Event	Gold	Silver	Bronze
Doubles	Vietnam; Thạch Tuấn Thanh; Lê Thị Thu Mai	Thailand; Jakkrapong Phanmaung; Phimphilai Phakhamchanthuek	Malaysia; Faiza Mohammad; Nur Thahira Tasnim
Doubles	Vietnam; Thạch Tuấn Thanh; Lê Thị Thu Mai	Thailand; Jakkrapong Phanmaung; Phimphilai Phakhamchanthuek	China; Jin Zhao; Yan Linlin

== Medal table ==
Rank	Nation	Gold	Silver	Bronze	Total
1	Thailand (THA)	5	1	3	9
2	Vietnam (VIE)	2	3	2	7
3	Laos (LAO)	1	2	5	8
4	Singapore (SIN)	1	0	1	2
5	Malaysia (MAS)	0	3	3	6
6	China (CHN)	0	0	2	2
7	Myanmar (MYA)	0	0	1	1
7	Turkmenistan (TKM)	0	0	1	1
Totals (8 entries)		9	9	18	36

== Results ==
=== Men ===
==== Shooting ====
17 November

===== Preliminary round =====
Rank	Athlete	Elim.	QF
1	Vatchara Songma (THA)	30	
2	Trần Ngọc Kiệt (VIE)	28	
3	Bouadeng Vongvone (LAO)	21	36
4	Cheng Zhi Ming (SIN)	14	36
5	Hadi Aulia Rachman (INA)	13	24
6	Syed Ali Syed Akil (MAS)	25	17
7	Han Liqiang (CHN)	21	15

===== Knockout round =====
Semifinals		Final
Vatchara Songma (THA)	20
Cheng Zhi Ming (SIN)	23	Cheng Zhi Ming (SIN)	40
Trần Ngọc Kiệt (VIE)	13	Bouadeng Vongvone (LAO)	37
Bouadeng Vongvone (LAO)	23

==== Singles ====
===== Preliminary round =====
17 November

Group A
Pos	Athlete	Pld	W	L	PF	PA	VIE	LAO	JPN	SIN	MYA
1	Vũ Khang Duy (VIE)	4	4	0	52	31	—	13–6	13–8	13–9	13–8
2	Siphandone Sisouphone (LAO)	4	3	1	45	18	6–13	—	13–0	13–5	13–0
3	Yukinori Saka (JPN)	4	2	2	34	45	8–13	0–13	—	13–10	13–9
4	Goh Wee Teck (SIN)	4	1	3	37	41	9–13	5–13	10–13	—	13–2
5	Htwe Ko Ko (MYA)	4	0	4	19	52	8–13	0–13	9–13	2–13	—

Group B
Pos	Athlete	Pld	W	L	PF	PA	MAS	THA	INA	IND
1	Hafizuddin Mat Daud (MAS)	3	3	0	39	21	—	13–7	13–12	13–2
2	Suranath Phadungsap (THA)	3	2	1	33	18	7–13	—	13–4	13–1
3	Ikhsan Budiman (INA)	3	1	2	29	27	12–13	4–13	—	13–1
4	Tarsem Sharma (IND)	3	0	3	4	39	2–13	1–13	1–13	—

Source: OCA

===== Knockout round =====
18 November

Semifinals		Final
Vũ Khang Duy (VIE)	7
Suranath Phadungsap (THA)	13	Suranath Phadungsap (THA)	13
Siphandone Sisouphone (LAO)	5	Hafizuddin Mat Daud (MAS)	6
Hafizuddin Mat Daud (MAS)	13

==== Doubles ====
===== Preliminary round =====
15 November

Group A
Pos	Team	Pld	W	L	PF	PA	VIE	LAO	MYA	CHN
1	Ngô Ron (VIE) Võ Minh Luân (VIE)	3	3	0	39	15	—	13–6	13–0	13–9
2	Lar Nienmany (LAO) Souphachith Dasolinh (LAO)	3	2	1	32	27	6–13	—	13–7	13–7
3	Kyaw Yin (MYA) Min Min Tun (MYA)	3	1	2	20	38	0–13	7–13	—	13–12
4	Sun Zhuo (CHN) Pan Jianmin (CHN)	3	0	3	28	39	9–13	7–13	12–13	—

Group B
Pos	Team	Pld	W	L	PF	PA	THA	MAS	SIN
1	Supan Thongphoo (THA) Sarawut Sriboonpeng (THA)	2	1	1	22	17	—	9–13	13–4
2	Saiful Bahari Musmin (MAS) Nuzul Azwan Ahmad Termizi (MAS)	2	1	1	25	22	13–9	—	12–13
3	Lim Jing Heng (SIN) Pang Shi Jie (SIN)	2	1	1	17	25	4–13	13–12	—

Source: OCA

===== Knockout round =====
16 November

Semifinals		Final
Ngô Ron (VIE); Võ Minh Luân (VIE)	13
Saiful Bahari Musmin (MAS); Nuzul Azwan Ahmad Termizi (MAS)	9	Ngô Ron (VIE); Võ Minh Luân (VIE)	10
Supan Thongphoo (THA); Sarawut Sriboonpeng (THA)	13	Supan Thongphoo (THA); Sarawut Sriboonpeng (THA)	13
Lar Nienmany (LAO); Souphachith Dasolinh (LAO)	4

==== Triples ====
===== Preliminary round =====
19 November

Group A
Pos	Team	Pld	W	L	PF	PA	VIE	THA	BRU	TKM
1	Vietnam	3	3	0	39	8	—	13–7	13–0	13–1
2	Thailand	3	2	1	33	18	7–13	—	13–5	13–0
3	Brunei	3	1	2	18	30	0–13	5–13	—	13–4
4	Turkmenistan	3	0	3	5	39	1–13	0–13	4–13	—

Group B
Pos	Team	Pld	W	L	PF	PA	MAS	LAO	IND	JPN
1	Malaysia	3	3	0	39	15	—	13–4	13–8	13–3
2	Laos	3	2	1	30	13	4–13	—	13–0	13–0
3	India	3	1	2	21	34	8–13	0–13	—	13–8
4	Japan	3	0	3	11	39	3–13	0–13	8–13	—

Source: OCA

===== Knockout round =====
20 November

Semifinals		Final
Vietnam	13
Laos	0	Vietnam	13
Thailand	11	Malaysia	9
Malaysia	13

=== Women ===
==== Shooting ====
17 November

===== Preliminary round =====
Rank	Athlete	Elim.	QF
1	Trần Lê Thanh Thảo (VIE)	38	
2	Khoun Souksavat (LAO)	34	
3	Oranit Natmanee (THA)	21	24
4	Nur Izzati Ismail (SIN)	21	16
5	Anis Amira Basri (MAS)	21	16

===== Knockout round =====
Semifinals		Final
Trần Lê Thanh Thảo (VIE)	23
Nur Izzati Ismail (SIN)	7	Trần Lê Thanh Thảo (VIE)	7
Oranit Natmanee (THA)	15	Khoun Souksavat (LAO)	24
Khoun Souksavat (LAO)	24

==== Singles ====
===== Preliminary round =====
17 November

Group A
Pos	Athlete	Pld	W	L	PF	PA	THA	MAS	JPN	TKM
1	Wannida Rooyoo (THA)	3	3	0	39	4	—	13–2	13–2	13–0
2	Siti Zubaidah Abu Talib (MAS)	3	2	1	28	21	2–13	—	13–8	13–0
3	Rieko Ujihara (JPN)	3	1	2	23	32	2–13	8–13	—	13–6
4	Sahragözel Nurberdiýewa (TKM)	3	0	3	6	39	0–13	0–13	6–13	—

Group B
Pos	Athlete	Pld	W	L	PF	PA	LAO	MYA	IND	CHN
1	Manyvanh Souliya (LAO)	3	3	0	39	19	—	13–9	13–1	13–9
2	Chaw Ei Thu (MYA)	3	2	1	35	25	9–13	—	13–2	13–10
3	Sanskruti Santosh Ghive (IND)	3	1	2	16	36	1–13	2–13	—	13–10
4	Sheng Enying (CHN)	3	0	3	29	39	9–13	10–13	10–13	—

Source: OCA

===== Knockout round =====
18 November

Semifinals		Final
Wannida Rooyoo (THA)	13
Chaw Ei Thu (MYA)	5	Wannida Rooyoo (THA)	13
Siti Zubaidah Abu Talib (MAS)	3	Manyvanh Souliya (LAO)	11
Manyvanh Souliya (LAO)	13

==== Doubles ====
===== Preliminary round =====
15 November

Group A
Pos	Team	Pld	W	L	PF	PA	THA	MAS	SIN
1	Phantipha Wongchuvej (THA) Thongsri Thamakord (THA)	2	2	0	26	3	—	13–2	13–1
2	Aribah Aida Hasan (MAS) Nurul Atiqah Abu Talib (MAS)	2	1	1	15	24	2–13	—	13–11
3	Sheryl Sim (SIN) Heo Boon Huay (SIN)	2	0	2	12	26	1–13	11–13	—

Group B
Pos	Team	Pld	W	L	PF	PA	LAO	CHN	MYA
1	Kanlaya Vongpasert (LAO) Aly Sengchanphet (LAO)	2	2	0	26	16	—	13–4	13–12
2	Lü Lin (CHN) Chao Guijin (CHN)	2	1	1	17	19	4–13	—	13–6
3	Pan Ei Phyo (MYA) Aye Aye Nyein (MYA)	2	0	2	18	26	12–13	6–13	—

Source: OCA

===== Knockout round =====
16 November

Semifinals		Final
Phantipha Wongchuvej (THA); Thongsri Thamakord (THA)	13
Lü Lin (CHN); Chao Guijin (CHN)	5	Phantipha Wongchuvej (THA); Thongsri Thamakord (THA)	13
Aribah Aida Hasan (MAS); Nurul Atiqah Abu Talib (MAS)	13	Aribah Aida Hasan (MAS); Nurul Atiqah Abu Talib (MAS)	6
Kanlaya Vongpasert (LAO); Aly Sengchanphet (LAO)	6

==== Triples ====
===== Preliminary round =====
19 November

Group A
Pos	Team	Pld	W	L	PF	PA	VIE	THA	JPN	CHN
1	Vietnam	3	3	0	39	19	—	13–11	13–7	13–1
2	Thailand	3	2	1	37	22	11–13	—	13–5	13–4
3	Japan	3	1	2	25	33	7–13	5–13	—	13–7
4	China	3	0	3	12	39	1–13	4–13	7–13	—

Group B
Pos	Team	Pld	W	L	PF	PA	LAO	TKM	IND
1	Laos	2	2	0	26	2	—	13–1	13–1
2	Turkmenistan	2	1	1	14	25	1–13	—	13–12
3	India	2	0	2	13	26	1–13	12–13	—

Source: OCA

===== Knockout round =====
20 November

Semifinals		Final
Vietnam	13
Turkmenistan	1	Vietnam	3
Thailand	13	Thailand	13
Laos	3

=== Mixed ===
==== Doubles ====
===== Preliminary round =====
15 November

Group A
Pos	Team	Pld	W	L	PF	PA	MAS	VIE	LAO	PHI	TKM
1	Faiza Mohammad (MAS) Nur Thahira Tasnim (MAS)	4	4	0	52	18	—	13–0	13–10	13–8	13–0
2	Thạch Tuấn Thanh (VIE) Lê Thị Thu Mai (VIE)	4	3	1	39	25	0–13	—	13–12	13–0	13–0
3	Xok Ananh Fongsanouvong (LAO) Lattana Phanasack (LAO)	4	2	2	48	32	10–13	12–13	—	13–5	13–1
4	Gilbert Dela Cruz (PHI) Violeta Dela Cruz (PHI)	4	1	3	26	48	8–13	0–13	5–13	—	13–9
5	Zinowiý Arşawskiý (TKM) Tatýana Kulik (TKM)	4	0	4	10	52	0–13	0–13	1–13	9–13	—

Group B
Pos	Team	Pld	W	L	PF	PA	CHN	THA	MGL	IND
1	Jin Zhao (CHN) Yan Linlin (CHN)	3	3	0	39	16	—	13–8	13–3	13–5
2	Jakkrapong Phanmaung (THA) Phimphilai Phakhamchanthuek (THA)	3	2	1	34	15	8–13	—	13–2	13–0
3	Altangereliin Bayarsaikhan (MGL) Püreviin Lkhagvasüren (MGL)	3	1	2	18	36	3–13	2–13	—	13–10
4	Vasu Sawhney (IND) Premlata Trivedi (IND)	3	0	3	15	39	5–13	0–13	10–13	—

Source: OCA

===== Knockout round =====
16 November

Semifinals		Final
Faiza Mohammad (MAS); Nur Thahira Tasnim (MAS)	0
Jakkrapong Phanmaung (THA); Phimphilai Phakhamchanthuek (THA)	13	Jakkrapong Phanmaung (THA); Phimphilai Phakhamchanthuek (THA)	6
Thạch Tuấn Thanh (VIE); Lê Thị Thu Mai (VIE)	13	Thạch Tuấn Thanh (VIE); Lê Thị Thu Mai (VIE)	13
Jin Zhao (CHN); Yan Linlin (CHN)	9
