= Sailing at the 2014 Asian Beach Games =

- Venue: Karon Beach
- Dates: 16–20 November 2014

Sailing competition at the 2014 Asian Beach Games was held in Phuket, Thailand from 16 to 20 November 2014 at Karon Beach, Phuket.

== Medalists ==
=== Men ===
Event	Gold	Silver	Bronze
RS:One	Geylord Coveta; Philippines	Natthaphong Phonoppharat; Thailand	Li Tao; China
RS:X	Liu Chunzhuang; China	Cho Won-woo; South Korea	Lee Chun Ting; Hong Kong
Laser	Chen Huichao; China	Khairulnizam Afendy; Malaysia	Keerati Bualong; Thailand
Optimist	Suthon Yampinid; Thailand	Dhiauddin Rozaini; Malaysia	Park Sung-bin; South Korea

=== Women ===
Event	Gold	Silver	Bronze
RS:One	Lu Yunxiu; China	Siripon Kaewduang-ngam; Thailand	Mariko Kojima; Japan
RS:X	Weng Qiaoshan; China	Zheng Manjia; China	Sarocha Prumprai; Thailand
Laser Radial	Zhang Dongshuang; China	Kamolwan Chanyim; Thailand	Gu Min; China
Optimist	Kamonchanok Klahan; Thailand	Nor Nabila Natasha Nazri; Malaysia	Sutida Poonpat; Thailand

=== Open ===
Event	Gold	Silver	Bronze
Hobie 16	Thailand; Damrongsak Vongtim; Kitsada Vongtim	Thailand; Teerapong Watiboonruang; Passuree Sompalasin	South Korea; Kim Keun-soo; Song Min-jae

== Medal table ==
Rank	Nation	Gold	Silver	Bronze	Total
1	China (CHN)	5	1	2	8
2	Thailand (THA)	3	4	3	10
3	Philippines (PHI)	1	0	0	1
4	Malaysia (MAS)	0	3	0	3
5	South Korea (KOR)	0	1	2	3
6	Hong Kong (HKG)	0	0	1	1
6	Japan (JPN)	0	0	1	1
Totals (7 entries)		9	9	9	27

== Results ==
=== Men ===
==== RS:One ====
16–20 November

Rank	Athlete	Race								Total
Rank	Athlete	1	2	3	4	5	6	7	8	Total
1st place, gold medalist(s)	Geylord Coveta (PHI)	~~(5)~~	2	2	1	1	5	2	1	14
2nd place, silver medalist(s)	Natthaphong Phonoppharat (THA)	1	1	~~(8)~~	3	4	7	1	2	19
3rd place, bronze medalist(s)	Li Tao (CHN)	3	3	6	2	2	1	~~(7)~~	3	20
4	Jun Ogawa (JPN)	2	5	4	~~(7)~~	5	3	4	4	27
5	Cheng Ho Yin (HKG)	~~(9)~~	4	5	4	3	8	3	6	33
6	Choi Cheol-hoon (KOR)	7	6	3	~~(10)~~	6	2	6	5	35
7	Yancy Kaibigan (PHI)	4	7	7	5	~~(9)~~	6	5	7	41
8	Seksan Khunthong (THA)	6	8	1	9	7	~~(10)~~	8	10	49
9	Chan Tsz Kit (HKG)	8	10	10	6	8	4	9	~~(11)~~	55
10	Chameera Lakshan (SRI)	10	~~(11)~~	9	8	10	9	11	8	65
11	Oo Khun Aung Thein (MYA)	11	9	~~(12)~~	11	11	11	10	9	72
12	Naing Thiha (MYA)	~~(13)~~	12	11	12	12	12	12	12	83

==== RS:X ====
16–20 November

Rank	Athlete	Race								Total
Rank	Athlete	1	2	3	4	5	6	7	8	Total
1st place, gold medalist(s)	Liu Chunzhuang (CHN)	1	1	1	3	1	6	1	~~(14)~~	14
2nd place, silver medalist(s)	Cho Won-woo (KOR)	3	~~(8)~~	3	1	2	4	2	1	16
3rd place, bronze medalist(s)	Lee Chun Ting (HKG)	2	4	~~(5)~~	2	4	3	5	4	24
4	Nyoman Suartana (INA)	~~(9)~~	7	2	6	3	2	6	2	28
5	Rafeek Kikabhoy (HKG)	5	2	6	4	~~(8)~~	8	4	8	37
6	Pornanan Payungkasem (THA)	8	6	8	5	~~(10)~~	1	9	3	40
7	Phattharadanai Chinain (THA)	4	3	7	~~(8)~~	6	5	8	7	40
8	Leonard Ong (SIN)	7	5	4	~~(14)~~	5	7	7	6	41
9	Harold Madrigal (PHI)	10	9	~~(12)~~	7	7	12	3	11	59
10	Kendell Magmanlac (PHI)	~~(14)~~	10	11	9	12	9	10	5	66
11	Qasim Abbas (PAK)	11	~~(12)~~	9	10	11	11	12	10	74
12	Khalid Hussain (PAK)	12	~~(13)~~	10	11	9	10	11	12	75
13	Ahmad Danish Hadi Kame (MAS)	6	11	~~(13)~~	12	13	13	13	9	77

==== Laser ====
16–20 November

Rank	Athlete	Race								Total
Rank	Athlete	1	2	3	4	5	6	7	8	Total
1st place, gold medalist(s)	Chen Huichao (CHN)	1	~~(3)~~	1	2	2	1	2	1	10
2nd place, silver medalist(s)	Khairulnizam Afendy (MAS)	2	1	2	~~(3)~~	3	2	1	3	14
3rd place, bronze medalist(s)	Keerati Bualong (THA)	4	~~(6)~~	3	1	4	3	3	2	20
4	Abdulla Janahi (BRN)	~~(9)~~	8	4	5	1	5	9	4	36
5	Ahmad Latif Khan (MAS)	6	2	7	4	6	~~(11)~~	6	6	37
6	Rubin Cruz (PHI)	3	4	9	8	9	~~(10)~~	7	5	45
7	Natthawut Paenyaem (THA)	~~(10)~~	5	6	6	8	9	4	8	46
8	Muhammad Tanveer (PAK)	5	10	10	9	5	4	5	~~(11)~~	48
9	Ebrahim Duaij Al-Doseri (BRN)	~~(11)~~	7	5	7	10	6	11	7	53
10	Najeeb Ullah Khan (PAK)	7	9	~~(11)~~	11	7	7	8	9	58
11	Bobi Hakim Sanjaya (INA)	8	~~(11)~~	8	10	11	8	10	10	65

==== Optimist ====
16–20 November

Rank	Athlete	Race								Total
Rank	Athlete	1	2	3	4	5	6	7	8	Total
1st place, gold medalist(s)	Suthon Yampinid (THA)	3	1	2	1	1	2	~~(4)~~	2	12
2nd place, silver medalist(s)	Dhiauddin Rozaini (MAS)	1	4	1	3	3	5	2	~~(6)~~	19
3rd place, bronze medalist(s)	Park Sung-bin (KOR)	2	3	~~(7)~~	2	2	6	6	1	22
4	Fauzi Kaman Shah (MAS)	4	2	6	4	~~(8)~~	1	1	5	23
5	Voravong Rachrattanaruk (THA)	7	5	3	6	~~(10)~~	4	3	3	31
6	Liao Tianpeng (CHN)	6	~~(10)~~	5	8	4	3	7	4	37
7	Wen Zaiding (CHN)	5	8	~~(11)~~	5	7	7	5	8	45
8	Saif Al-Mansoori (UAE)	12	6	4	10	6	14	~~(16)~~	7	59
9	Syarif Hidayatullah (INA)	~~(13)~~	12	8	9	9	8	9	11	66
10	Khaled Showaiter (BRN)	10	~~(14)~~	12	7	11	10	8	9	67
11	Salim Al-Alawi (OMA)	11	7	14	12	5	9	~~(16)~~	10	68
12	Mohamed Al-Hammadi (UAE)	8	9	10	11	12	~~(13)~~	10	12	72
13	Muhammad Azeem (PAK)	~~(14)~~	13	9	13	14	11	11	13	84
14	Marwan Al-Jabri (OMA)	9	11	13	~~(14)~~	13	12	12	14	84
15	Muhammad Abdullah (PAK)	15	~~(16)~~	15	15	15	15	13	16	104

=== Women ===
==== RS:One ====
16–20 November

Rank	Athlete	Race								Total
Rank	Athlete	1	2	3	4	5	6	7	8	Total
1st place, gold medalist(s)	Lu Yunxiu (CHN)	~~(2)~~	2	1	1	1	2	1	1	9
2nd place, silver medalist(s)	Siripon Kaewduang-ngam (THA)	1	1	~~(2)~~	2	2	1	2	2	11
3rd place, bronze medalist(s)	Mariko Kojima (JPN)	4	3	4	~~(8)~~	3	5	7	5	31
4	Lee Yu-jin (KOR)	8	4	5	~~(10)~~	9	4	4	3	37
5	Hoiriyah (INA)	~~(9)~~	5	6	7	6	3	6	4	37
6	Sandy Choi (HKG)	5	8	3	4	4	6	8	~~(10)~~	38
7	Duangkamon Phongern (THA)	3	~~(10)~~	9	3	7	7	3	7	39
8	Chen Hong (CHN)	6	7	7	5	5	8	~~(12)~~	6	44
9	Chan Yau Ching (HKG)	~~(10)~~	6	10	6	8	10	5	8	53
10	Katherine Ong (MAS)	7	9	8	9	~~(10)~~	9	9	9	60
11	Min Shwe Ya (MYA)	11	11	11	~~(12)~~	12	11	10	11	77

==== RS:X ====
16–20 November

Rank	Athlete	Race								Total
Rank	Athlete	1	2	3	4	5	6	7	8	Total
1st place, gold medalist(s)	Weng Qiaoshan (CHN)	1	2	2	1	1	1	1	~~(9)~~	9
2nd place, silver medalist(s)	Zheng Manjia (CHN)	2	1	1	2	5	2	4	~~(9)~~	17
3rd place, bronze medalist(s)	Sarocha Prumprai (THA)	3	3	3	4	3	3	~~(6)~~	1	20
4	Ma Kwan Ching (HKG)	~~(7)~~	4	4	3	2	4	2	2	21
5	Krongkaew Sakulfaeng (THA)	6	5	5	5	~~(8)~~	5	3	5	34
6	Hmwe July (MYA)	5	6	6	6	6	~~(8)~~	5	4	38
7	Geh Cheow Lin (MAS)	~~(8)~~	8	8	7	4	6	7	3	43
8	Chun Sa-bin (KOR)	4	7	7	~~(8)~~	7	7	8	6	46

==== Laser Radial ====
16–20 November

Rank	Athlete	Race								Total
Rank	Athlete	1	2	3	4	5	6	7	8	Total
1st place, gold medalist(s)	Zhang Dongshuang (CHN)	1	1	1	3	2	4	1	~~(9)~~	13
2nd place, silver medalist(s)	Kamolwan Chanyim (THA)	3	4	2	1	~~(5)~~	2	3	1	16
3rd place, bronze medalist(s)	Gu Min (CHN)	2	3	3	4	1	1	~~(6)~~	2	16
4	Khairunneeta Afendy (MAS)	5	~~(7)~~	4	2	3	3	2	4	23
5	Nur Shazrin Mohd Latif (MAS)	~~(7)~~	5	6	7	4	6	4	3	35
6	Alaiza Belmonte (PHI)	4	2	7	6	~~(8)~~	7	7	5	38
7	Kanapan Pachatikapanya (THA)	~~(6)~~	6	5	5	6	5	5	6	38
8	Mariyanti (INA)	8	8	8	8	7	8	8	~~(9)~~	55

==== Optimist ====
16–20 November

Rank	Athlete	Race								Total
Rank	Athlete	1	2	3	4	5	6	7	8	Total
1st place, gold medalist(s)	Kamonchanok Klahan (THA)	4	3	2	1	1	1	~~(7)~~	5	17
2nd place, silver medalist(s)	Nor Nabila Natasha Nazri (MAS)	2	4	4	2	3	2	1	~~(6)~~	18
3rd place, bronze medalist(s)	Sutida Poonpat (THA)	1	1	~~(5)~~	5	4	4	2	2	19
4	Qiu Xiaoming (CHN)	5	2	~~(11)~~	4	2	5	5	3	26
5	Natashya Nabila Sawal (MAS)	3	5	3	~~(6)~~	5	3	3	4	26
6	Kim Da-jeong (KOR)	~~(6)~~	6	1	3	6	6	4	1	27
7	Suci Indah Ramadhani (INA)	~~(7)~~	7	6	7	7	7	6	7	47
8	Samiha Al-Riyami (OMA)	8	8	7	8	8	8	8	~~(11)~~	55
9	Salama Al-Mansoori (UAE)	9	~~(11)~~	8	10	9	9	9	9	63
10	Almaha Al-Marzooqi (UAE)	10	~~(11)~~	9	9	10	10	10	8	66

=== Open ===
==== Hobie 16 ====
16–20 November

Rank	Team	Race								Total
Rank	Team	1	2	3	4	5	6	7	8	Total
1st place, gold medalist(s)	Thailand (THA); Damrongsak Vongtim; Kitsada Vongtim	~~(4)~~	2	1	2	1	2	1	1	10
2nd place, silver medalist(s)	Thailand (THA); Teerapong Watiboonruang; Passuree Sompalasin	1	3	2	~~(4)~~	3	4	2	3	18
3rd place, bronze medalist(s)	South Korea (KOR); Kim Keun-soo; Song Min-jae	3	1	4	~~(5)~~	4	1	3	4	20
4	Hong Kong (HKG); Tong Yui Shing; Tong Kit Fong	2	5	3	3	2	5	4	~~(6)~~	24
5	Philippines (PHI); Richly Magsanay; Ridgely Balladares	5	4	5	1	5	3	~~(6)~~	2	25
6	Bahrain (BRN); Muhanna Al-Doseri; Mustafa Janahi	~~(7)~~	7	6	6	6	6	5	5	41
