= Water skiing at the 2014 Asian Beach Games =

- Venue: Anthem Wake Park; Bangneowdam Reservoir
- Dates: 16–22 November 2014

Water skiing competition at the 2014 Asian Beach Games was held in Phuket, Thailand from 16 to 22 November 2014 at Bangneowdam Reservoir and Anthem Wake Park, Phuket.

== Medalists ==
=== Skiing ===
Event	Gold	Silver	Bronze
Men's slalom	Salvador Chiha; Lebanon	Cho Beom-geun; South Korea	Kim See-hyung; South Korea
Men's tricks	Shi Longfei; China	Febrianto Kadir; Indonesia	Cho Beom-geun; South Korea
Women's slalom	Sasha Christian; Singapore	Han Ah-reum; South Korea	Ummu Thoyibhatus Sholikah; Indonesia
Women's tricks	Jiang Hui; China	Aaliyah Yoong; Malaysia	Saaya Hirosawa; Japan
Team overall	South Korea; Cho Beom-geun; Jeong Ji-min; Kim See-hyung; Han Ah-reum; Jang Da-hyeong; Kim Su-mi	Japan; Masaaki Hamada; Shohei Nagami; Shintaro Yukawa; Saaya Hirosawa; Kazumi Inoue; Harue Kamiya	Indonesia; Indra Hardinata; Febrianto Kadir; Dimas Ridho Suprihono; Galuh Mutiara Maulidina; Nur Alimah Priambodo; Ummu Thoyibhatus Sholikah

=== Wakeboarding ===
Event	Gold	Silver	Bronze
Men's wakeboard	Toshiki Yasui; Japan	Yun Sang-hyun; South Korea	Padiwat Jaemjan; Thailand
Women's wakeboard	Han Qiu; China	Yun Hee-hyun; South Korea	Sasha Christian; Singapore
Team overall	South Korea; Lee Woo-suk; Yun Sang-hyun; Joo Seul-kee; Yun Hee-hyun	Thailand; Padiwat Jaemjan; Bunyalo Jumruang; Tatsanai Kuakoonrat; Premchit Chakritniran; Pattanan Pamonpol; Saranya Wainitra	China; Jier Didi; Tang Daibo; Yu Huangkun; Chen Lili; Duan Zhenkun; Han Qiu

=== Cable ===
Event	Gold	Silver	Bronze
Men's cable wakeboard	Im San; South Korea	Mackinthai Thomas Rosen; Thailand	Yun Sang-hyun; South Korea
Men's cable wakeskate	Techin Nakajima; Thailand	Burid Detwilaisri; Thailand	Obi Cembrano; Philippines
Women's cable wakeboard	Duan Zhenkun; China	Yun Hee-hyun; South Korea	Srirasin Khamklom; Thailand
Women's cable wakeskate	Tantanasorn Chaiyabood; Thailand	Susan Larsson; Philippines	Tulip Tadtiam; Thailand
Team overall	Thailand; Burid Detwilaisri; Techin Nakajima; Mackinthai Thomas Rosen; Ken Tackmann; Tantanasorn Chaiyabood; Srirasin Khamklom; Panyapa Tangsirirat	South Korea; Im San; Lee Woo-suk; Yun Sang-hyun; Joo Seul-kee; Yun Hee-hyun	Philippines; Symon Cantos; Obi Cembrano; Christian Joson; Angelo Linao; Samantha Bermudez; Susan Larsson; Andrea Tanjangco

== Medal table ==
Rank	Nation	Gold	Silver	Bronze	Total
1	China (CHN)	4	0	1	5
2	South Korea (KOR)	3	6	3	12
3	Thailand (THA)	3	3	3	9
4	Japan (JPN)	1	1	1	3
5	Singapore (SIN)	1	0	1	2
6	Lebanon (LIB)	1	0	0	1
7	Indonesia (INA)	0	1	2	3
7	Philippines (PHI)	0	1	2	3
9	Malaysia (MAS)	0	1	0	1
Totals (9 entries)		13	13	13	39

== Results ==
=== Skiing ===
==== Men's slalom ====
19–20 November

Rank	Athlete	Prel.	Final
1st place, gold medalist(s)	Salvador Chiha (LIB)	33.00	32.50
2nd place, silver medalist(s)	Cho Beom-geun (KOR)	29.00	32.00
3rd place, bronze medalist(s)	Kim See-hyung (KOR)	28.00	26.00
4	Tarek Bou Maachar (LIB)	28.00	26.00
5	Indra Hardinata (INA)	25.00	23.00
6	Toshiyuki Sumita (JPN)	14.00	19.50
7	Nattawut Hapholdee (THA)	9.00	17.25
8	Ade Hermana (INA)	13.50	14.50
8	Syahir Asyraf Nasir (MAS)	11.25	14.50
10	Mark Leong (SIN)	16.50	6.00
11	Shintaro Yukawa (JPN)	4.50	
12	Deng Kaifeng (CHN)	2.00	
12	Tang Daibo (CHN)	2.00	
14	Nguyễn Uy Trường (VIE)	1.00	
15	Thierry Grappe (THA)	0.50	
—	Symon Cantos (PHI)	DNS	

==== Men's tricks ====
19–20 November

Rank	Athlete	Prel.	Final
1st place, gold medalist(s)	Shi Longfei (CHN)	4110	3800
2nd place, silver medalist(s)	Febrianto Kadir (INA)	4030	3770
3rd place, bronze medalist(s)	Cho Beom-geun (KOR)	2960	3470
4	Jeong Ji-min (KOR)	3360	3320
5	Toshiyuki Sumita (JPN)	2770	3050
6	Shintaro Yukawa (JPN)	2990	2770
7	Luo Feng (CHN)	2360	
8	Aiden Yoong (MAS)	2310	
9	Dimas Ridho Suprihono (INA)	1900	
10	Adam Yoong (MAS)	1480	
11	Thierry Grappe (THA)	870	
—	Angelo Linao (PHI)	DNS	

==== Women's slalom ====
19–20 November

Rank	Athlete	Prel.	Final
1st place, gold medalist(s)	Sasha Christian (SIN)	19.00	22.25
2nd place, silver medalist(s)	Han Ah-reum (KOR)	20.50	21.00
3rd place, bronze medalist(s)	Ummu Thoyibhatus Sholikah (INA)	17.00	19.00
4	Saaya Hirosawa (JPN)	16.00	17.00
5	Kalya Kee (SIN)	20.00	15.50
6	Jang Da-hyeong (KOR)	15.50	12.00
7	Aaliyah Yoong (MAS)	10.50	
8	Pattanan Pamonpol (THA)	5.25	
9	Hiroko Komori (JPN)	4.00	
9	Weeraya Rosendahl (THA)	4.00	
11	Gong Langbo (CHN)	1.00	
—	Arianna Chow (MAS)	DNS	
—	Li Qiuzhuo (CHN)	DNS	

==== Women's tricks ====
19–20 November

Rank	Athlete	Prel.	Final
1st place, gold medalist(s)	Jiang Hui (CHN)	5660	5660
2nd place, silver medalist(s)	Aaliyah Yoong (MAS)	5730	5230
3rd place, bronze medalist(s)	Saaya Hirosawa (JPN)	3570	3420
4	Hiroko Komori (JPN)	3410	3250
5	Nur Alimah Priambodo (INA)	3210	2900
6	Jang Da-hyeong (KOR)	2960	2760
7	Galuh Mutiara Maulidina (INA)	2450	
8	Han Ah-reum (KOR)	1990	
9	Kalya Kee (SIN)	1100	
—	Chen Lili (CHN)	DNS	

==== Team overall ====
21–22 November

Rank	Team	Score
1st place, gold medalist(s)	South Korea (KOR)	5333.92
2nd place, silver medalist(s)	Japan (JPN)	5125.95
3rd place, bronze medalist(s)	Indonesia (INA)	4033.80
4	Malaysia (MAS)	3224.08
5	Singapore (SIN)	2542.73
6	China (CHN)	2537.25
7	Lebanon (LIB)	1939.02
8	Thailand (THA)	1148.48
9	Philippines (PHI)	0

=== Wakeboarding ===
==== Men's wakeboard ====
===== Quarterfinals =====
19 November

Rank	Athlete	Score
Heat 1
1	Tatsanai Kuakoonrat (THA)	78.89
2	Wan Ka Choi (HKG)	52.00
3	Wang Wenjun (CHN)	22.33
4	Symon Cantos (PHI)	18.67
Heat 2
1	Yun Sang-hyun (KOR)	73.33
2	Alek Hanif (INA)	47.78
3	Karl El-Khazen (LIB)	43.89
4	Tang Daibo (CHN)	13.89
Heat 3
1	Cheung Ho Lung (HKG)	56.67
2	Surdinsya (INA)	43.45
3	Angelo Linao (PHI)	27.22
4	Nguyễn Uy Trường (VIE)	20.00
Heat 4
1	Toshiki Yasui (JPN)	83.67
2	Padiwat Jaemjan (THA)	81.00
3	Lee Woo-suk (KOR)	78.45
4	Tarek Bou Maachar (LIB)	30.00
5	Jeff Oh (MAS)	14.44

===== Last chance qualifiers =====
20 November

Rank	Athlete	Score
Heat 1
1	Karl El-Khazen (LIB)	51.67
2	Nguyễn Uy Trường (VIE)	16.67
3	Angelo Linao (PHI)	10.00
—	Tang Daibo (CHN)	DNS
Heat 2
1	Lee Woo-suk (KOR)	63.89
2	Tarek Bou Maachar (LIB)	42.78
3	Symon Cantos (PHI)	21.45
4	Jeff Oh (MAS)	17.78
—	Wang Wenjun (CHN)	DNS

===== Semifinals =====
20 November

Rank	Athlete	Score
Heat 1
1	Yun Sang-hyun (KOR)	78.78
2	Tatsanai Kuakoonrat (THA)	59.45
3	Wan Ka Choi (HKG)	50.78
4	Alek Hanif (INA)	45.67
5	Karl El-Khazen (LIB)	40.22
Heat 2
1	Toshiki Yasui (JPN)	80.33
2	Padiwat Jaemjan (THA)	62.22
3	Cheung Ho Lung (HKG)	54.56
4	Lee Woo-suk (KOR)	48.78
5	Surdinsya (INA)	30.00

===== Final =====
20 November

Rank	Athlete	Score
1st place, gold medalist(s)	Toshiki Yasui (JPN)	83.34
2nd place, silver medalist(s)	Yun Sang-hyun (KOR)	81.11
3rd place, bronze medalist(s)	Padiwat Jaemjan (THA)	76.11
4	Tatsanai Kuakoonrat (THA)	62.23
5	Cheung Ho Lung (HKG)	48.89
6	Wan Ka Choi (HKG)	41.67

==== Women's wakeboard ====
===== Quarterfinals =====
19 November

Rank	Athlete	Score
Heat 1
1	Yun Hee-hyun (KOR)	57.89
2	Sasha Christian (SIN)	52.22
3	Saranya Wainitra (THA)	25.00
4	Andrea Tanjangco (PHI)	15.00
Heat 2
1	Han Qiu (CHN)	61.67
2	Joo Seul-kee (KOR)	42.22
—	Samantha Bermudez (PHI)	DNS
—	Rusdi Amir (INA)	DNS
Heat 3
1	Chen Lili (CHN)	63.89
2	Rumi Matsuura (JPN)	57.89
3	Pattanan Pamonpol (THA)	31.67
4	Cheah Hsu Ann (MAS)	18.89
5	Galuh Mutiara Maulidina (INA)	16.67

===== Last chance qualifiers =====
20 November

Rank	Athlete	Score
Heat 1
1	Pattanan Pamonpol (THA)	28.89
2	Cheah Hsu Ann (MAS)	15.00
Heat 2
1	Galuh Mutiara Maulidina (INA)	37.78
2	Saranya Wainitra (THA)	14.33
3	Andrea Tanjangco (PHI)	10.00

===== Semifinals =====
20 November

Rank	Athlete	Score
Heat 1
1	Han Qiu (CHN)	56.23
2	Yun Hee-hyun (KOR)	55.67
3	Rumi Matsuura (JPN)	49.78
4	Galuh Mutiara Maulidina (INA)	28.89
Heat 2
1	Sasha Christian (SIN)	49.56
2	Joo Seul-kee (KOR)	42.78
3	Chen Lili (CHN)	41.67
4	Pattanan Pamonpol (THA)	29.44

===== Final =====
20 November

Rank	Athlete	Score
1st place, gold medalist(s)	Han Qiu (CHN)	75.34
2nd place, silver medalist(s)	Yun Hee-hyun (KOR)	67.56
3rd place, bronze medalist(s)	Sasha Christian (SIN)	59.78
4	Chen Lili (CHN)	52.78
5	Joo Seul-kee (KOR)	44.22
6	Rumi Matsuura (JPN)	40.00

==== Team overall ====
21–22 November

Rank	Team	Score
1st place, gold medalist(s)	South Korea (KOR)	290
2nd place, silver medalist(s)	Thailand (THA)	182
3rd place, bronze medalist(s)	China (CHN)	158
4	Japan (JPN)	90
5	Indonesia (INA)	64
6	Hong Kong (HKG)	60
7	Malaysia (MAS)	44
8	Philippines (PHI)	39

=== Cable ===
==== Men's cable wakeboard ====
16 November

===== Semifinals =====
Rank	Athlete	Score
Heat 1
1	Mackinthai Thomas Rosen (THA)	85.67
2	Angelo Linao (PHI)	68.33
3	Symon Cantos (PHI)	58.00
4	Julian Shamdas (HKG)	42.33
5	Fahkrudin Mohd Yasin (SIN)	39.33
6	Gao Xiaojin (CHN)	18.33
Heat 2
1	Im San (KOR)	90.67
2	Yun Sang-hyun (KOR)	85.33
3	Ken Tackmann (THA)	75.00
4	Juo Shang-cheng (TPE)	54.00
5	Alek Hanif (INA)	51.67
6	Yu Huangkun (CHN)	38.33
7	Cheung Ho Lung (HKG)	26.00

===== Last chance qualifier =====
Rank	Athlete	Score
1	Juo Shang-cheng (TPE)	59.67
2	Fahkrudin Mohd Yasin (SIN)	57.00
3	Alek Hanif (INA)	52.33
4	Yu Huangkun (CHN)	47.67
5	Julian Shamdas (HKG)	44.00
6	Gao Xiaojin (CHN)	35.67
7	Cheung Ho Lung (HKG)	25.00

===== Final =====
Rank	Athlete	Score
1st place, gold medalist(s)	Im San (KOR)	95.33
2nd place, silver medalist(s)	Mackinthai Thomas Rosen (THA)	91.67
3rd place, bronze medalist(s)	Yun Sang-hyun (KOR)	86.00
4	Ken Tackmann (THA)	85.00
5	Symon Cantos (PHI)	69.33
6	Juo Shang-cheng (TPE)	56.00
7	Fahkrudin Mohd Yasin (SIN)	50.00
8	Angelo Linao (PHI)	16.67

==== Men's cable wakeskate ====
16 November

===== Semifinals =====
Rank	Athlete	Score
Heat 1
1	Burid Detwilaisri (THA)	71.67
2	Techin Nakajima (THA)	70.67
3	Alek Hanif (INA)	39.33
4	Fahkrudin Mohd Yasin (SIN)	36.00
Heat 2
1	Obi Cembrano (PHI)	71.67
2	Yun Sang-hyun (KOR)	30.00
3	Lee Woo-suk (KOR)	22.67
4	Christian Joson (PHI)	0.33

===== Last chance qualifier =====
Rank	Athlete	Score
1	Fahkrudin Mohd Yasin (SIN)	43.00
2	Lee Woo-suk (KOR)	18.00
3	Alek Hanif (INA)	15.00
—	Christian Joson (PHI)	DNS

===== Final =====
Rank	Athlete	Score
1st place, gold medalist(s)	Techin Nakajima (THA)	86.67
2nd place, silver medalist(s)	Burid Detwilaisri (THA)	86.00
3rd place, bronze medalist(s)	Obi Cembrano (PHI)	78.00
4	Fahkrudin Mohd Yasin (SIN)	55.00
5	Yun Sang-hyun (KOR)	47.67
6	Lee Woo-suk (KOR)	39.33

==== Women's cable wakeboard ====
16 November

===== Semifinals =====
Rank	Athlete	Score
Heat 1
1	Duan Zhenkun (CHN)	88.00
2	Srirasin Khamklom (THA)	87.33
3	Samantha Bermudez (PHI)	73.33
4	Andrea Tanjangco (PHI)	67.33
5	Rumi Matsuura (JPN)	50.33
6	Galuh Mutiara Maulidina (INA)	25.00
Heat 2
1	Yun Hee-hyun (KOR)	65.00
2	Panyapa Tangsirirat (THA)	48.00
3	Keiko Inoue (JPN)	45.00
4	Teng Pei-shan (TPE)	43.33
5	Joo Seul-kee (KOR)	37.67
6	Zhang Wei (CHN)	24.33

===== Last chance qualifier =====
Rank	Athlete	Score
1	Andrea Tanjangco (PHI)	68.33
2	Teng Pei-shan (TPE)	54.00
3	Rumi Matsuura (JPN)	45.33
4	Joo Seul-kee (KOR)	42.67
5	Galuh Mutiara Maulidina (INA)	25.00
6	Zhang Wei (CHN)	20.00

===== Final =====
Rank	Athlete	Score
1st place, gold medalist(s)	Duan Zhenkun (CHN)	78.00
2nd place, silver medalist(s)	Yun Hee-hyun (KOR)	74.67
3rd place, bronze medalist(s)	Srirasin Khamklom (THA)	71.67
4	Keiko Inoue (JPN)	57.67
5	Andrea Tanjangco (PHI)	53.33
6	Samantha Bermudez (PHI)	46.33
7	Panyapa Tangsirirat (THA)	43.67
8	Teng Pei-shan (TPE)	40.00

==== Women's cable wakeskate ====
16 November

===== Semifinal =====
Rank	Athlete	Score
1	Susan Larsson (PHI)	69.67
2	Tulip Tadtiam (THA)	68.33
3	Tantanasorn Chaiyabood (THA)	63.33
4	Teng Pei-shan (TPE)	32.67
5	Yun Hee-hyun (KOR)	30.00
6	Joo Seul-kee (KOR)	28.33
7	Nur Alimah Priambodo (INA)	17.67

===== Last chance qualifier =====
Rank	Athlete	Score
1	Yun Hee-hyun (KOR)	26.67
2	Joo Seul-kee (KOR)	24.00
3	Nur Alimah Priambodo (INA)	15.33

===== Final =====
Rank	Athlete	Score
1st place, gold medalist(s)	Tantanasorn Chaiyabood (THA)	85.00
2nd place, silver medalist(s)	Susan Larsson (PHI)	82.00
3rd place, bronze medalist(s)	Tulip Tadtiam (THA)	75.33
4	Teng Pei-shan (TPE)	58.33
5	Yun Hee-hyun (KOR)	50.00
6	Joo Seul-kee (KOR)	40.00

==== Team overall ====
17–18 November

Rank	Team	Score
1st place, gold medalist(s)	Thailand (THA)	5341
2nd place, silver medalist(s)	South Korea (KOR)	5079
3rd place, bronze medalist(s)	Philippines (PHI)	3802
4	Indonesia (INA)	1846
5	China (CHN)	1760
6	Chinese Taipei (TPE)	1650
7	Japan (JPN)	971
8	Hong Kong (HKG)	681
