= Triathle at the 2014 Asian Beach Games =

- Venue: Naiyang Beach
- Dates: 20–21 November 2014

The Triathle (as Beach Modern Pentathlon) competition at the 2014 Asian Beach Games was held in Phuket, Thailand from 20 to 21 November 2014 at Naiyang Beach, Phuket.

Triathle is a new development initiative by UIPM where athletes compete in a shoot swim run competition.

== Medalists ==
Event	Gold	Silver	Bronze
Men's individual	Jun Woong-tae; South Korea	Lee Ji-hun; South Korea	Li Shuhuan; China
Women's individual	Huo Qi; China	Bian Yufei; China	Valeriia Uvarova; Kyrgyzstan
Mixed relay	South Korea; Kim Se-hee; Jun Woong-tae	China; Huo Qi; Zhang Linbin	Kazakhstan; Olga Boiko; Vladislav Sukharev

== Medal table ==
Rank	Nation	Gold	Silver	Bronze	Total
1	South Korea (KOR)	2	1	0	3
2	China (CHN)	1	2	1	4
3	Kazakhstan (KAZ)	0	0	1	1
3	Kyrgyzstan (KGZ)	0	0	1	1
Totals (4 entries)		3	3	3	9

== Results ==
=== Men's individual ===
20 November

Rank	Athlete	Time
1st place, gold medalist(s)	Jun Woong-tae (KOR)	17:57
2nd place, silver medalist(s)	Lee Ji-hun (KOR)	18:10
3rd place, bronze medalist(s)	Li Shuhuan (CHN)	18:22
4	Zhang Linbin (CHN)	19:03
5	Vladislav Sukharev (KAZ)	19:45
6	John Chicano (PHI)	20:22
7	Ho Shao-wei (TPE)	20:52
8	Thanongsak Manchai (THA)	21:00
9	Yuriy Galushko (UZB)	21:14
10	Radion Khripchenko (KGZ)	21:46
11	Denis Tyurin (KAZ)	22:04
12	Wootichai Moonratsi (THA)	22:55
13	Liu Shen-hung (TPE)	23:31
14	Sourabh Patil (IND)	23:33
15	Viraj Pardeshi (IND)	23:50
16	Mönkh-Erdeniin Itgel (MGL)	24:48

=== Women's individual ===
20 November

Rank	Athlete	Time
1st place, gold medalist(s)	Huo Qi (CHN)	20:06
2nd place, silver medalist(s)	Bian Yufei (CHN)	20:28
3rd place, bronze medalist(s)	Valeriia Uvarova (KGZ)	20:36
4	Kim Se-hee (KOR)	21:57
5	Kim Mangrobang (PHI)	22:01
6	Han Song-yi (KOR)	22:20
7	Sanruthai Arunsiri (THA)	23:08
8	Olga Boiko (KAZ)	23:28
9	Xeniya Atamanskaya (KAZ)	23:47
10	Chenkhuan Nammala (THA)	23:48
11	Tejashree Sanjay Naik (IND)	25:37
12	Erdenebatyn Uyanga (MGL)	26:30
13	Arina Djonalieva (UZB)	26:52
14	Wang Li-ting (TPE)	27:06
15	Lin Yen-chun (TPE)	27:12
—	Baby Kumari (IND)	DNF

=== Mixed relay ===
21 November

Rank	Team	Time
1st place, gold medalist(s)	South Korea (KOR); Kim Se-hee; Jun Woong-tae	17:15
2nd place, silver medalist(s)	China (CHN); Huo Qi; Zhang Linbin	17:16
3	China (CHN); Bian Yufei; Li Shuhuan	17:32
3rd place, bronze medalist(s)	Kazakhstan (KAZ); Olga Boiko; Vladislav Sukharev	18:09
5	Kyrgyzstan (KGZ); Valeriia Uvarova; Radion Khripchenko	19:18
6	Thailand (THA); Sanruthai Arunsiri; Natthaphon Kesornphron	19:44
7	Kazakhstan (KAZ); Xeniya Atamanskaya; Denis Tyurin	19:48
8	Philippines (PHI); Kim Mangrobang; John Chicano	19:53
9	South Korea (KOR); Moon Hye-rim; Kim Kyung-min	20:04
10	Uzbekistan (UZB); Arina Djonalieva; Yuriy Galushko	21:09
11	Chinese Taipei (TPE); Wang Li-ting; Ho Shao-wei	21:10
12	Thailand (THA); Chenkhuan Nammala; Pipatpon Ingkanont	21:44
13	Chinese Taipei (TPE); Lin Yen-chun; Liu Shen-hung	22:16
14	Mongolia (MGL); Erdenebatyn Uyanga; Mönkh-Erdeniin Itgel	22:48
15	India (IND); Tejashree Sanjay Naik; Viraj Pardeshi	22:53
16	India (IND); Baby Kumari; Alagu Bala Subramanian	24:56

- Kazakhstan was awarded bronze because of no more than one medal per country rule.
