= Japan at the 2014 Asian Beach Games =

- IOC code: JPN
- NOC: Japanese Olympic Committee
- Website: https://www.joc.or.jp

in Phuket November 14 – November 23
- Competitors: 95
- Medals Ranked 8th: Gold 7 Silver 5 Bronze 7 Total 19

Asian Beach Games appearances
- 2008; 2010; 2012; 2014; 2016; 2026

Japan participated in the 2014 Asian Beach Games in Phuket, Thailand from 14 – 23 November 2014.

== Medalists ==
Medal	Name	Sport	Event	Date
Gold	Hikaru Aono	Beach wrestling	Women's freestyle -50 kg	November 15
Gold	Ryo Sueoka	Triathlon	Men's duathlon	November 15
Gold	Yurie Kato	Triathlon	Women's duathlon	November 15
Gold	Ryo Sueoka; Yuya Fukaura; Fumika Matsumoto; Yurie Kato	Triathlon	Mixed team duathlon	November 15
Gold	Ai Ueda	Triathlon	Women's triathlon	November 17
Gold	Hirokatsu Tayama; Yuichi Hosoda; Ai Ueda; Yuka Sato	Triathlon	Mixed team triathlon	November 17
Gold	Toshiki Yasui	Waterskiing	Men's wakeboard	November 20
Silver	Yuya Fukaura	Triathlon	Men's duathlon	November 15
Silver	Miku Saito	Beach wrestling	Women's freestyle +60 kg	November 17
Silver	Yuka Sato	Triathlon	Women's triathlon	November 17
Silver	Shingo Terukina; Tetsuji Sugita; Hirofumi Oda; Naoya Matsuo; Masahito Toma; Ozu Moreira; Takasuke Goto; Takaaki Oba; Takuya Akaguma; Takashi Takiguchi	Beach Soccer	Men's tournament	November 21
Silver	Masaaki Hamada; Shohei Nagami; Shintaro Yukawa; Saaya Hirosawa; Kazumi Inoue; Harue Kamiya	Waterskiing	Team overall	November 22
Bronze	Yoshihiro Shindo; Kenta Tanei; Yoshiya Nishioka; Yu Horita; Ayumu Iwai; Naoki Yoshimatsu; Keita Suzuki; Kyohei Shimizu; Kotaro Chiba; Keisuke Narita	Beach flag football	Men's tournament	November 13
Bronze	Takeru Nobeashi	Beach kurash	Men -73 kg	November 16
Bronze	Fumika Matsumoto	Triathlon	Women's duathlon	November 15
Bronze	Mariko Kojima	Sailing	Women's RS:One	November 20
Bronze	Saaya Hirosawa	Waterskiing	Women's tricks	November 20
Bronze	Takeshi Furuta; Makoto Kawamura; Masaki Komatsu; Yoshiki Oka	Air sports	Men's team accuracy	November 21
Bronze	Takahiro Mizoguchi	Bodybuilding	Flyweight +162 cm	November 22

Medals by sport
Sport	1st place, gold medalist(s)	2nd place, silver medalist(s)	3rd place, bronze medalist(s)	Total
Triathlon	5	2	1	8
Waterskiing	1	1	1	3
Beach wrestling	1	1	0	2
Beach soccer	0	1	0	1
Air sports	0	0	1	1
Beach flag football	0	0	1	1
Bodybuilding	0	0	1	1
Kurash	0	0	1	1
Sailing	0	0	1	1
Total	7	5	7	19

Medals by day
Day	1st place, gold medalist(s)	2nd place, silver medalist(s)	3rd place, bronze medalist(s)	Total
Nov 12	0	0	0	0
Nov 13	0	0	1	1
Nov 14	0	0	0	0
Nov 15	4	1	1	6
Nov 16	0	0	1	1
Nov 17	2	2	0	4
Nov 18	0	0	0	0
Nov 19	0	0	0	0
Nov 20	1	0	2	3
Nov 21	0	1	1	2
Nov 22	0	1	1	2
Nov 23	0	0	0	0
Total	7	5	7	19

== Competitors ==
Sport	Men	Women	Total
Air sports	4	0	4
Beach flag football	10	0	10
Beach handball	14	9	23
Beach soccer	14	0	14
Beach volleyball	4	1	5
Beach wrestling	2	2	4
Extreme sports	1	0	1
Kurash	3	0	3
Pétanque	4	4	8
Sailing	1	1	2
Sambo	3	0	3
Triathlon	4	4	8
Waterskiing	3	5	8
Total	67	26	93

== Air sports ==
=== Paragliding accuracy ===
Athlete	Event	Final	
Athlete	Event	Points	Rank
Makoto Kawamura	Men's Individual	58	6
Yoshiki Oka	Men's Individual		
Masaki Komatsu	Men's Individual	867	21
Takeshi Furuta	Men's Individual	1060	23
Japan	Team	735	3rd place, bronze medalist(s)

== Beach flag football ==
group play

Team	Pld	W	D	L	PF	PA	PD	Pts
Thailand	5	5	0	0	297	125	+172	15
Japan	5	4	0	1	248	119	+129	12
Kuwait	5	3	0	2	233	146	+87	9
China	5	2	0	3	209	227	−18	6
Philippines	5	1	0	4	122	215	−93	3
India	5	0	0	5	76	353	−277	0

12 November; 9:00	Japan	41–36	Kuwait	Saphan Hin, Phuket
12 November; 9:00		(27–18)		Saphan Hin, Phuket

12 November; 13:00	Japan	61–6	Philippines	Saphan Hin, Phuket
12 November; 13:00		(34–6)		Saphan Hin, Phuket

12 November; 16:00	India	12–55	Japan	Saphan Hin, Phuket
12 November; 16:00		(6–29)		Saphan Hin, Phuket

13 November; 9:00	Japan	55–26	China	Saphan Hin, Phuket
13 November; 9:00		(28–6)		Saphan Hin, Phuket

13 November; 11:00	Thailand	39–36	Japan	Saphan Hin, Phuket
13 November; 11:00		(12–12)		Saphan Hin, Phuket

semifinals

13 November; 16:00	Japan	34–40	Kuwait	Saphan Hin, Phuket
13 November; 16:00		(27–14)		Saphan Hin, Phuket

final rank

== Beach Handball ==
=== Men's Tournament ===
Team	Pld	W	L	SF	SA	Pts
Qatar	4	4	0	8	0	8
Oman	4	3	1	6	2	6
Vietnam	4	2	2	4	4	4
Japan	4	1	3	2	6	2
Hong Kong	4	0	4	0	8	0

=== Women's Tournament ===
Team	Pld	W	L	SF	SA	Pts
Thailand	4	4	0	8	1	8
China	4	3	1	7	3	6
Hong Kong	4	2	2	5	4	4
Japan	4	1	3	2	6	2
India	4	0	4	0	8	0

== Beach Soccer ==
Group Play

Team	Pld	W	WE	WP	L	GF	GA	GD	Pts
United Arab Emirates	2	1	0	1	0	6	2	+4	4
Japan	2	1	0	0	1	5	2	+3	3
Malaysia	2	0	0	0	2	4	11	−7	0

16 November
11:00

Japan	5–2	Malaysia
Oda 5'; Akaguma 20', 26'; Ozu 31'; Goto 34' (pen.)	Report	Nor 4'; Mohamad 13'

Saphan Hin Sport Center, Phuket
Referee: Suwat Wongsuwan (Thailand)
18 November
12:15

Japan	0–0 (a.e.t.)	United Arab Emirates
	Report
Penalties
Ozu (penalty missed); Akaguma (penalty missed)	0–2	(penalty scored) Al-Hammadi; (penalty scored) Daryaei

Saphan Hin Sport Center, Phuket
Referee: Liang Shao (China)

quarterfinal

19 November
12:15

China	3–7	Japan
Wen Tingyuan 2'; Chen Xiaowei 20'; Cai Weiming 25'	Report	Akaguma 5', 32'; Oba 16'; Goto 19'; Ozu 30'; Oda 35'; Matsuo 36'

Saphan Hin Sport Center, Phuket
Referee: Bakhtiyor Namazov (Uzbekistan)

semifinal

20 November
13:30

Vietnam	2–7	Japan
Trần Vĩnh Phong 12'; Bùi Trần Tuấn Anh 24'	Report	Ozu 7', 27'; Akaguma 21'; Toma 24'; Oba 26'; Goto 31', 34'

Saphan Hin Sport Center, Phuket
Referee: Suhaimi Mat Hassan (Malaysia)
21 November
14:45

Japan	3–4	Iran
Ozu 10', 25'; Goto 17'	Report	Mojdeh 6'; Naderi 8'; Akbari 28'; Abdollahi 33'

Saphan Hin Sport Center, Phuket
Referee: Suhaimi Mat Hassan (Malaysia)

final rank

== Beach Volleyball ==
Athlete	Event	Preliminary round	Standing	Round of 16	Quarterfinals	Semifinals	Final / BM	
Athlete	Event	Opposition Score	Standing	Opposition Score	Opposition Score	Opposition Score	Opposition Score	Rank
Koichi Nishimura; Tsuchiya	Men's	Pool C (Kazakhstan) Sergey Bogatu – Pustynnikov| L 0 –2 (21–17, 27–25) (Timor-Leste) Xavier – Correia| W 2 – 0 (21–10, 21–16) (Vietnam) Nguyễn – Võ; W 2 – 0 (21–14, 21–14) (China) Jiaxin – Yang Cong| L 0 – 2 (21–23, 16–21)	3 Q					

== Extreme Sports ==
=== Inline Skate ===
Athlete	Event	Qualification		Final	
Athlete	Event	Height	Position	Height	Position
Takeshi Yasutoko	Big air	DNS		did not advance	
Takeshi Yasutoko	Park	DNS		did not advance	

== Kurash ==
Athlete	Event	Qualification	Round of 16	Quarterfinal	Semifinal	Repechage 1	Repechage 2	Final / BM	
Athlete	Event	Opposition Result	Opposition Result	Opposition Result	Opposition Result	Opposition Result	Opposition Result	Opposition Result	Rank
[									

== Sailing ==
men

Athlete	Event	Race								Net points	Final rank
Athlete	Event	1	2	3	4	5	6	7	8	Net points	Final rank
Jun Ogawa	RS:One	2	5	4	(7)	5	3	4	4	27	4

women

Athlete	Event	Race								Net points	Final rank
Athlete	Event	1	2	3	4	5	6	7	8	Net points	Final rank
Mariko Kojima		4	3	4	(8)	3	5	7	5	31	3rd place, bronze medalist(s)

== Triathlon ==
=== Triathlon ===
Athlete	Event	Swim	Trans 1	Bike	Trans 2	Run	Total Time	Rank
Hirokatsu Tayama	Men's	00:54:37	00:09:21	00:00:33	00:28:53	00:00:15	00:15:35	4
Yuichi Hosoda	Men's	00:55:48	00:09:27	00:00:36	00:28:42	00:00:19	00:16:44	9
Ai Ueda	Women's	01:00:30	00:10:19	00:00:36	00:31:45	00:00:18	00:17:32	1st place, gold medalist(s)
Yuka Sato	Women's	01:00:56	00:09:58	00:00:36	00:32:07	00:00:20	00:17:55	2nd place, silver medalist(s)
Yuka Sato; Hirokatsu Tayama; Ai Ueda; Yuichi Hosoda	4 x 4 relay	00:23:39; 00:22:25; 00:23:54; 00:22:26	00:04:19; 00:04:12; 00:04:46; 00:04:11	00:00:33; 00:00:32; 00:00:33; 00:00:35	00:11:31; 00:11:06; 00:11:24; 00:10:25	00:00:21; 00:00:16; 00:00:18; 00.00.19	00:06:55; 00:06:19; 00:06:53; 00:06:56	1st place, gold medalist(s)

== Waterskiing ==
=== Skiing ===
Men

Athlete	Event	Heat		Final	
Athlete	Event	Result	Rank	Result	Rank
Toshiyuki Sumita		14.00		19.50	
Shintaro Yukawa		4.50	11	did not advance	

Women

Athlete	Event	Heat		Final	
Athlete	Event	Result	Rank	Result	Rank
Saaya Hirosawa	Women's slalom	16.00		17.00	
Hiroko Komori	Women's slalom	4.00		did not advance	
Saaya Hirosawa	Women's tricks	3570		3420	3rd place, bronze medalist(s)
Hiroko Komori	Women's tricks	3410		3250	
