= Aparajitha Balamurukan =

Indian squash player (born 1994)

Personal information
- Born: 17 March 1994 (age 32) Erode, Tamil Nadu, India
- Height: 1.69 m (5 ft 7 in)
- Weight: 57 kg (126 lb)

Sport
- Country: India
- Handedness: right-handed
- Turned pro: 2009
- Coached by: Cyrus Poncha
- Retired: Active
- Racquet used: Head

women's singles
- Highest ranking: 77 (August 2010)
- Current ranking: 150 (October 2019)
Medal record
Women's squash
Representing India
Asian Games
Silver medal – second place	2014 Incheon	Team
Asian Beach Games
Bronze medal – third place	2014 Phuket	Singles
- Updated on 8 October 2019

Aparajitha Balamurukan (born 17 March 1994) is an Indian female academic and professional squash player who is generally a regular member of the Indian squash team. She achieved her highest career PSA ranking of World No. 77 in August 2010 during the 2010 PSA World Tour.

== Early life ==
Aparajitha was born in Erode and raised in Chennai. Her father Balamurukan was a prominent businessman. She took the interest on the sport of squash at the age of eight.

== Career ==
She joined the Professional Squash Association in 2009 at the age of 15 and took part in the 2009 PSA World Tour. She signed for a coaching camp in basic squash training at the ICL Academy. Aparajitha completed her MBA degree while playing squash.

She received her maiden opportunity to represent India at the 2012 Women's World Team Squash Championships and was part of the team which was defeated 0–3 by Egypt in the quarterfinals. She also represented India at the 2014 Asian Games and claimed a silver medal in the women's team event, losing 0–2 to Malaysia. In the same year, she also competed at the 2014 World University Squash Championship. However her career rankings dropped below 100 after 2014 despite a promising start to her career in 2009.

At the 2019 Women's Asian Individual Squash Championships, she reached third round of the event and lost to Hong Kong's Liu Tsz Ling.
