= South Korea at the 2014 Asian Beach Games =

- IOC code: KOR
- NOC: Korean Olympic Committee

in Phuket
- Competitors: 114 (72 men & 42 women) in 14 sports
- Medals Ranked 3rd: Gold 9 Silver 14 Bronze 14 Total 37

Asian Beach Games appearances
- 2008; 2010; 2012; 2014; 2016; 2026

South Korea participated in the 2014 Asian Beach Games in Phuket, Thailand from 14 to 23 November 2014.

South Korea also won 9 gold medals, 14 silver medals, 14 bronze medals and a total of 37 medals, finishing third on the medal table.

== Competitors ==
| Sport | Men | Women | Total |
|---|---|---|---|
| Air Sports | 9 | 5 | 14 |
| Beach Kabaddi | 9 | 6 | 15 |
| Beach Modern Pentathlon | 3 | 3 | 6 |
| Beach Sepaktakraw | 10 | 10 | 20 |
| Beach Wrestling | 3 | 2 | 5 |
| Bodybuilding | 4 | 0 | 4 |
| Extreme Sports | 6 | 0 | 6 |
| Foot Volley | 4 | 0 | 4 |
| Muaythai | 4 | 1 | 5 |
| Sailing/Windsurfing | 5 | 3 | 8 |
| Sambo | 2 | 2 | 4 |
| Sport Climbing | 5 | 3 | 8 |
| Triathlon | 2 | 2 | 4 |
| WaterSki | 6 | 5 | 11 |
| Total | 72 | 42 | 114 |

== Medal summary ==
=== Medal by sport ===
Medals by sport
| Sport | 1st place, gold medalist(s) | 2nd place, silver medalist(s) | 3rd place, bronze medalist(s) | Total |
|---|---|---|---|---|
| Air Sports | 1 | 1 | 2 | 4 |
| Beach Kabaddi | 0 | 0 | 1 | 1 |
| Beach Modern Pentathlon | 2 | 1 | 0 | 3 |
| Beach Sepaktakraw | 0 | 2 | 2 | 4 |
| Beach Wrestling | 1 | 0 | 0 | 1 |
| Bodybuilding | 0 | 1 | 2 | 3 |
| Muaythai | 0 | 1 | 1 | 2 |
| Sailing/Windsurfing | 0 | 1 | 2 | 3 |
| Sambo | 1 | 0 | 1 | 2 |
| Triathlon | 1 | 1 | 0 | 2 |
| WaterSki | 3 | 6 | 3 | 12 |
| Total | 9 | 14 | 14 | 37 |

=== Medal by Date ===
Medals by date
| Day | Date | 1st place, gold medalist(s) | 2nd place, silver medalist(s) | 3rd place, bronze medalist(s) | Total |
|---|---|---|---|---|---|
| –1 | 12 Nov | 1 | 0 | 1 | 2 |
| 0 | 13 Nov | 0 | 0 | 0 | 0 |
| 1 | 14 Nov | 0 | 0 | 0 | 0 |
| 2 | 15 Nov | 0 | 0 | 0 | 0 |
| 3 | 16 Nov | 2 | 1 | 1 | 4 |
| 4 | 17 Nov | 1 | 1 | 0 | 2 |
| 5 | 18 Nov | 0 | 2 | 1 | 3 |
| 6 | 19 Nov | 0 | 0 | 0 | 0 |
| 7 | 20 Nov | 1 | 6 | 5 | 12 |
| 8 | 21 Nov | 2 | 2 | 3 | 7 |
| 9 | 22 Nov | 2 | 2 | 3 | 7 |
| 10 | 23 Nov | 0 | 0 | 0 | 0 |
| Total | | 9 | 14 | 14 | 37 |
