= Geylord Coveta =

Filipino sailor (born 1981)

Personal information
- Nationality: Filipino
- Born: 25 August 1981 (age 45)
- Height: 1.65 m (5 ft 5 in)
- Weight: 60 kg (132 lb)

Sailing career
- Sport: Sailing
- Coached by: German Paz
- Classes: Mistral, RS:X, RS:One
Medal record
Men's sailing
Representing Philippines
Southeast Asian Games
Bronze medal – third place	2011 Jakarta	Mistral-Windsurfer
Silver medal – second place	2013 Naypyidaw	RS:X-Windsurfer
RS: One World Championships
Gold medal – first place	2012 Boracay	RS:One-Windsurfer
Asian Beach Games
Gold medal – first place	2014 Phuket	RS:One-Windsurfer

Geylord Coveta (born August 25, 1981) is a Filipino sailor who competes in the Mistral, RS:X, RS:One racing classes. He took up the sport of sailing in 1997. He competed at the 2014 Asian Games where he was selected as flag-bearer for his country. He studied at the University of Batangas.
