= Squash at the 2014 Asian Beach Games =

- Venue: Karon Beach
- Dates: 13–16 November 2014

Squash competition at the 2014 Asian Beach Games was held in Karon Beach, Phuket, Thailand from 13 to 16 November 2014.

== Medalists ==
Event	Gold	Silver	Bronze
Men's singles	Harinder Pal Sandhu; India	Yip Tsz Fung; Hong Kong	Asim Khan; Pakistan
Men's singles	Harinder Pal Sandhu; India	Yip Tsz Fung; Hong Kong	Kush Kumar; India
Women's singles	Liu Tsz Ling; Hong Kong	Tong Tsz Wing; Hong Kong	Aparajitha Balamurukan; India
Women's singles	Liu Tsz Ling; Hong Kong	Tong Tsz Wing; Hong Kong	Li Dongjin; China

== Medal table ==
Rank	Nation	Gold	Silver	Bronze	Total
1	Hong Kong (HKG)	1	2	0	3
2	India (IND)	1	0	2	3
3	China (CHN)	0	0	1	1
3	Pakistan (PAK)	0	0	1	1
Totals (4 entries)		2	2	4	8

== Results ==
=== Men's singles ===
Round of 16; 13 November
Khalid Al-Hendawi (QAT)	7	2	1
Navid Maleksabet (IRI)	4	7	7
Wong Chi Him (HKG)	7	7
Reymark Begornia (PHI)	1	5
Yang Tianxia (CHN)	2	3
Asim Khan (PAK)	7	7
Kush Kumar (IND)	7	7
David Pelino (PHI)	5	2
Poowis Poonsiri (THA)	4	7	7
Shen Jiaqi (CHN)	7	5	5
Abbas Shoukat (PAK)	4	7	7
Farzad Shokouhi (IRI)	7	2	6
Sandi Arisma Cipta (INA)	3	4
Yip Tsz Fung (HKG)	7	7

Quarterfinals; 13 November
Harinder Pal Sandhu (IND)	7	7
Navid Maleksabet (IRI)	1	2
Wong Chi Him (HKG)	4	3
Asim Khan (PAK)	7	7
Kush Kumar (IND)	7	7
Poowis Poonsiri (THA)	2	4
Abbas Shoukat (PAK)	4	6
Yip Tsz Fung (HKG)	7	7

Semifinals; 15 November
Harinder Pal Sandhu (IND)	7	7
Asim Khan (PAK)	1	1
Kush Kumar (IND)	6	2
Yip Tsz Fung (HKG)	7	7

Gold medal match 16 November
Harinder Pal Sandhu (IND)	7	5	7
Yip Tsz Fung (HKG)	2	7	3

=== Women's singles ===
Round of 16; 13 November
Anantana Prasertratanakul (THA)	7	2	2
Riffat Khan (PAK)	6	7	7

Quarterfinals; 13 November
Tong Tsz Wing (HKG)	7	7
Riffat Khan (PAK)	3	3
Duan Siyu (CHN)	2	4
Aparajitha Balamurukan (IND)	7	7
Li Dongjin (CHN)	7	7
Catur Yuliana (INA)	6	2
Sammer Anjum (PAK)	1	1
Liu Tsz Ling (HKG)	7	7

Semifinals; 15 November
Tong Tsz Wing (HKG)	7	7
Aparajitha Balamurukan (IND)	4	6
Li Dongjin (CHN)	4	6
Liu Tsz Ling (HKG)	7	7

Gold medal match 16 November
Tong Tsz Wing (HKG)	2	0
Liu Tsz Ling (HKG)	7	7
