= Takasuke Goto =

Japanese footballer and beach soccer player

Personal information
- Date of birth: 4 June 1985 (age 41)
- Place of birth: Kanagawa, Japan
- Height: 1.73 m (5 ft 8 in)
- Position: Midfielder

Youth career
- 2001–2003: Komazawa University High School

College career
Years	Team	Apps	(Gls)
2004	Nippon Bunri University		
2005	Okinawa International University		

Senior career*
Years	Team	Apps	(Gls)
2005	Okinawa Kariyushi		
2006	Lequios FC (beach)		
2009	Albirex Niigata Singapore	2	(0)
2010–2015	Lequios FC (beach)		
2011	BSC Bienne Hatchards (beach)		(4)
2012	BSC Jona (beach)		(16)
2012	Inter Milan (beach)		
2012	Prado Junior (beach)		
2013	Romagna BS (beach)		
2013	BSC Bienne Hatchards (beach)		
2013	USA (beach)		
2013	Düsseldorf (beach)		
2013	Maccabi Tel Aviv (beach)		
2013	Los Angeles BS (beach)		
2014	Romagna BS (beach)		
2014	BSC Bienne Hatchards (beach)		
2014	Maccabi Netanya (beach)		
2015	Milano (beach)		
2015	Qingdao Rule Restaurant (beach)		
2015	Sporting CP (beach)		
2015	Barcelona (beach)		
2016	Fusion (beach)		
2016	Romagna BS (beach)		
2016	Dalian (beach)		
2017	Tokyo Verdy BS (beach)		
2017	ACD O Sotão (beach)		
2017	Maccabi Tel Aviv (beach)		
2017	Nõmme (beach)		
2017	Qingdao BS (beach)		
2017	Flamengo (beach)		
2018	Lequios FC (beach)		
2019	Marseille (beach)		(10)
2019	Lazio (beach)		
2020–	FC Ryukyu BS (beach)		

International career
2006–2019	Japan Beach Soccer	72	(83)
- * Club domestic league appearances and goals

Takasuke Goto (後藤 崇介, Gotō Takasuke; born 4 June 1985) is a Japanese former footballer and beach soccer player.

== Career statistics ==
=== Club ===
As of 11 December 2019.

Club	Season	League			Cup		Continental		Other		Total	
Club	Season	Division	Apps	Goals	Apps	Goals	Apps	Goals	Apps	Goals	Apps	Goals
Albirex Niigata	2009	S.League	2	0	0	0	0	0	0	0	2	0
Career total			2	0	0	0	0	0	0	0	2	0
