= 2014 Asian Beach Games =

IV Asian Beach Games
- Host city: Phuket, Thailand
- Motto: Celebrate Charming Sunshine
- Nations: 42
- Athletes: 2,335
- Events: 165 in 26 sports
- Opening: 14 November
- Closing: 23 November
- Opened by: Surayud Chulanont; Privy Council of Thailand
- Closed by: Kobkarn Wattanavrangkul; Tourism and Sports Minister of Thailand
- Main venue: Saphan Hin Park & Sport Center
- Website: phuketthailand2014.com

The Fourth Asian Beach Games were held in Phuket, Thailand. The games were originally scheduled for Boracay Island, Aklan, Philippines, but was affected by the OCA's hosting changes.

The games were held on the same year of the 17th Asian Games. It was the seventh time for Thailand to host an Asia level multi-sports event, after Bangkok held four Asian Games (1966, 1970, 1978 and 1998), one Asian Indoor Games (2005) and one Asian Martial Arts Games (2009). However, it was the first time that the event would not be held in Bangkok.

== Development ==
=== Host selection ===
Phuket was not the original host of the 2014 Asian Games. Initially the island resort of Boracay in Kalibo, Aklan was awarded the hosting rights for the Games in 2006. In November 2010, the 2014 Games was moved to Phuket, Thailand.

=== Venues ===
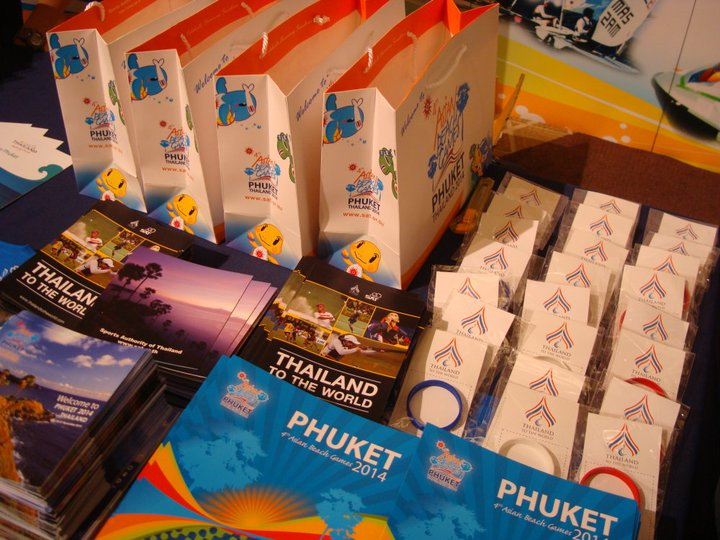
Public relations of IV Asian Beach Games.

The 4th Asian Beach Games have 6 venues for this games.

Cluster	Competition venue	Sports
Patong Cluster	Patong North 1	Beach wrestling, Beach kabaddi, Petanque
Patong Cluster	Patong North 2	Beach sepak takraw, Footvolley
Patong Cluster	Patong North 3	Jetski Sport
Patong Cluster	Patong Central Beach	Muaythai, Kurash, Brazilian Jiu-jitsu
Karon Cluster	Karon North 1	Beach water polo, Open water swimming, Bodybuilding, 3x3 basketball
Karon Cluster	Karon North 2	Beach handball, Sailing
Karon Cluster	Karon Central Beach	Beach volleyball, Sambo
Karon Cluster	Karon South Beach	Woodball, Squash
Naiyang Cluster	Naiyang	Triathlon, Modern triathle, Beach athletics
Bangneow Dam Cluster	Anthem Wake Park	Water skiing – Cable
Bangneow Dam Cluster	Bangneow Dam	Water skiing – Ski
Chaofa Cluster	Chaofa Mine	Air sports
Saphan Hin Cluster	Saphan Hin	Beach soccer, Beach flag football, Extreme sports, Sport climbing

== Torch relay ==
H.M. King Bhumibol Adulyadej has graciously designated H.R.H. Crown Prince Maha Vajiralongkorn on October 23 at Amphorn Sathan Residential Hall, Dusit Palace as the Royal Representative to deliver the Royal Flame to the organizing committee for use in the 4th Asian Beach Games.

Those who have granted an audience to receive the Royal Flame from H.R.H. Crown Prince Maha Vajiralongkorn were the organising committee members led by Tourism and Sports Minister Kobkarn Wattanavrangkul as the chairwoman of the organizing committee, Yuthasak Sasiprapha, president of the Olympic Committee of Thailand, Montri Chaipun, deputy governor of the Sports Authority of Thailand who also served as the SAT's caretaker governor, and Phuket Governor Nisit Chamsomwong.

Dr.Jaturaporn Na Nakhon, chairman of the Royal Flame Committee, revealed that after this the installment of the Royal Flame will be temporarily made at the SAT Office in Hua Mark. The Flame will next be transferred to Phuket on November 10. To celebrate the Games Flame, Thai people from all walks of life can join the Flame run in three different districts which comprise Kathu District on November 11, Mueang Phuket District the following day and Thalang District on November 13.

- Sports

The 4th Asian Beach Games have 26 sports were contested in this edition of Asian Beach Games.

- 3x3 basketball (2)
- Air sports
  - Paragliding (4)
  - Paramotoring (4)
- Aquatics
  - Beach water polo (1)
  - Open water swimming (4)
- Beach athletics (12)
- Beach flag football (1)
- Beach handball (2)
- Beach kabaddi (2)
- Beach kurash (8)
- Beach sambo (7)
- Beach sepak takraw (6)
- Beach soccer (1)
- Beach volleyball (2)
- Beach woodball (8)
- Beach wrestling (6)
- Bodybuilding (6)
- Extreme sports
  - Aggressive inline (3)
  - BMX freestyle (4)
  - Skateboarding (3)
  - Sport climbing (4)
- Footvolley (1)
- Jet ski (6)
- Ju-jitsu (12)
- Muaythai (15)
- Pétanque (9)
- Sailing
  - Sailing (5)
  - Windsurfing (4)
- Squash (2)
- Triathle (3)
- Triathlon
  - Duathlon (3)
  - Triathlon (3)
- Water skiing (13)

== Calendar ==
OC	Opening ceremony	●	Event competitions	1	Event finals	CC	Closing ceremony

November 2014	12th Wed	13th Thu	14th Fri	15th Sat	16th Sun	17th Mon	18th Tue	19th Wed	20th Thu	21st Fri	22nd Sat	23rd Sun	Gold medals
3x3 basketball				●	●	●	2						2
Air sports – Paragliding				●	●		●	●		4			4
Air sports – Paramotoring				●	●	●	●	●	4				4
Aquatics – Beach water polo							●	●	●	●	1		1
Aquatics – Open water swimming				2		2							4
Beach athletics								2	3	4	3		12
Beach flag football	●	●	1										1
Beach handball				●	●	●	●	●	●	●	2		2
Beach kabaddi								●	●	●	●	2	2
Beach kurash				2	3	3							8
Beach sambo	6	1											7
Beach sepak takraw					●	●	2	●	1	1	●	2	6
Beach soccer				●	●	●	●	●	●	1			1
Beach volleyball					●	●	●	●	●	●	●	2	2
Beach woodball			2	●	●	2	2	2					8
Beach wrestling				2	2	2							6
Bodybuilding										●	5		5
Extreme sports – BMX freestyle						●	2	1	1				4
Extreme sports – Roller freestyle						●	1	1	1				3
Extreme sports – Skateboarding						●	●	1	2				3
Footvolley			●	1									1
Jet ski						3	2	1					6
Ju-jitsu	6	6											12
Muaythai							●	●	●	●	15		15
Pétanque				●	3	2	2	●	2				9
Sailing					●	●		●	9				9
Sport climbing				2	2								4
Squash		●		●	2								2
Triathle									2	1			3
Triathlon – Duathlon				3									3
Triathlon – Triathlon						3							3
Water skiing					4	●	1	●	6	●	2		13
Ceremonies			OC									CC	—N/a
Daily medal events	12	7	3	12	16	17	14	8	31	11	28	6	165
November 2014	12th Wed	13th Thu	14th Fri	15th Sat	16th Sun	17th Mon	18th Tue	19th Wed	20th Thu	21st Fri	22nd Sat	23rd Sun	Gold medals

== Participating nations ==
42 out of the 45 Asian countries took part. North Korea, Saudi Arabia and Palestine did not compete. Below is a list of all the participating NOCs; the number of competitors per delegation is indicated in brackets.

- Afghanistan (15)
- Bahrain (53)
- Bangladesh (37)
- Bhutan (4)
- Brunei (12)
- Cambodia (9)
- China (199)
- Chinese Taipei (58)
- Timor-Leste (4)
- Hong Kong (88)
- India (117)
- Indonesia (104)
- Iran (86)
- Iraq (14)
- Japan (93)
- Jordan (17)
- Kazakhstan (69)
- Kuwait (69)
- Kyrgyzstan (12)
- Laos (41)
- Lebanon (25)
- Macau (4)
- Malaysia (114)
- Maldives (11)
- Mongolia (32)
- Myanmar (24)
- Nepal (9)
- Oman (61)
- Pakistan (51)
- Philippines (80)
- Qatar (57)
- Singapore (27)
- South Korea (109)
- Sri Lanka (23)
- Syria (26)
- Tajikistan (19)
- Thailand (358)
- Turkmenistan (60)
- United Arab Emirates (39)
- Uzbekistan (36)
- Vietnam (145)
- Yemen (6)

== Medal table ==
* Host nation (Thailand)

Rank	Nation	Gold	Silver	Bronze	Total
1	Thailand (THA)*	56	37	33	126
2	China (CHN)	16	11	21	48
3	South Korea (KOR)	9	14	14	37
4	Iran (IRI)	9	14	8	31
5	Vietnam (VIE)	8	12	20	40
6	Kazakhstan (KAZ)	8	9	10	27
7	Indonesia (INA)	7	7	14	28
8	Japan (JPN)	7	5	7	19
9	Mongolia (MGL)	6	0	4	10
10	Bahrain (BRN)	5	2	0	7
11	United Arab Emirates (UAE)	4	3	5	12
12	Chinese Taipei (TPE)	3	8	6	17
13	Hong Kong (HKG)	3	2	7	12
13	Philippines (PHI)	3	2	7	12
15	Uzbekistan (UZB)	3	0	6	9
16	Pakistan (PAK)	2	4	4	10
17	Lebanon (LIB)	2	3	3	8
18	Laos (LAO)	2	2	8	12
18	Qatar (QAT)	2	2	8	12
20	India (IND)	2	1	7	10
21	Singapore (SIN)	2	0	2	4
22	Kuwait (KUW)	1	4	6	11
23	Turkmenistan (TKM)	1	3	7	11
24	Syria (SYR)	1	1	6	8
25	Tajikistan (TJK)	1	0	2	3
26	Brunei (BRU)	1	0	0	1
27	Malaysia (MAS)	0	8	8	16
28	Kyrgyzstan (KGZ)	0	3	3	6
29	Iraq (IRQ)	0	2	3	5
30	Afghanistan (AFG)	0	2	2	4
31	Myanmar (MYA)	0	1	2	3
32	Macau (MAC)	0	1	0	1
32	Oman (OMA)	0	1	0	1
32	Yemen (YEM)	0	1	0	1
35	Sri Lanka (SRI)	0	0	2	2
36	Cambodia (CAM)	0	0	1	1
36	Jordan (JOR)	0	0	1	1
36	Nepal (NEP)	0	0	1	1
Totals (38 entries)		164	165	238	567

== Marketing ==
=== Emblem ===
The two palm trees standing side by side represents the coming together of athletes and of all participants from different nations and races, to unite and to participate together in the 4th Asian Beach Games.

The middle contains ocean waves tinted in the color of the Thai flag symbolizes the qualities in which Thailand possesses; the Thai flag swirling could be understood as a representation of the determination of the athletes in participating in the competition.

=== Mascot ===
Sakorn, Sintu, and Samut

The mascots of the Games were three sea turtles named Sakorn, Sintu, and Samut. According to the organising committee, the sea turtle was chosen as a symbol of endurance, fertility, sustainability, and growth, and to highlight sea turtle conservation efforts in Thailand, as the waters around Phuket are a habitat for several sea turtle species.

As sea turtles are amphibious creatures, living both on land and in the sea, the 4th Asian Beach Games had both beach sports and water sports.

The name Sintu (Thai: สินธุ์), Sakorn (Thai: สาคร), Samut (Thai: สมุทร) shares the same meaning of water.

Could be metaphorically be compared to the qualities of athletes which includes the qualities such as tolerance, tranquility, unity, acceptance, sportsmanship and friendship.

Preceded by Haiyang	Asian Beach Games; Phuket; 4th ABG (2014)	Succeeded by Da Nang
