= Yurie Kato =

Japanese triathlete

Personal information
- Nationality: Japanese
- Born: 27 January 1987 (age 38)

Sport
- Sport: Triathlon

Yurie Kato (加藤 友里恵, Katō Yurie; born 27 January 1987) is a Japanese triathlete. She finished in second place at the 2014 ITU Triathlon World Cup event in Jiayuguan.
