= Roller sports at the 2014 Asian Beach Games =

- Venue: Saphan Hin
- Dates: 17–20 November 2014

Roller sports (as Extreme sports) competition at the 2014 Asian Beach Games was held in Phuket, Thailand from 17 to 20 November 2014 at the Saphan Hin Sports Center, Phuket.

== Medalists ==
=== Aggressive inline ===
Event	Gold	Silver	Bronze
Big air	Zhang Hekai; China	Natthawat Chitprommetta; Thailand	Nasrul Afiq Mansor; Malaysia
Park	Worapoj Boonnim; Thailand	Jeerasak Tassorn; Thailand	Wang Wei-chieh; Chinese Taipei
Park best trick	Jeerasak Tassorn; Thailand	Hung Chien-kai; Chinese Taipei	Worapoj Boonnim; Thailand

=== Skateboarding ===
Event	Gold	Silver	Bronze
Park	Johnnie Tang; Hong Kong	Athiwat Rueangsri; Thailand	Liu Jiaming; China
Park best trick	Pakorn Panutai; Thailand	Wang Guohua; China	Napat Wijidjarung; Thailand
Game of Skate	Luk Chun Yin; Hong Kong	Sutat Siriwat; Thailand	Johnnie Tang; Hong Kong

== Medal table ==
Rank	Nation	Gold	Silver	Bronze	Total
1	Thailand (THA)	3	4	2	9
2	Hong Kong (HKG)	2	0	1	3
3	China (CHN)	1	1	1	3
4	Chinese Taipei (TPE)	0	1	1	2
5	Malaysia (MAS)	0	0	1	1
Totals (5 entries)		6	6	6	18

== Results ==
=== Aggressive inline ===
==== Big air ====
20 November

Rank	Athlete	Height
1st place, gold medalist(s)	Zhang Hekai (CHN)	4.40
2nd place, silver medalist(s)	Natthawat Chitprommetta (THA)	4.30
3rd place, bronze medalist(s)	Nasrul Afiq Mansor (MAS)	4.30
4	Ardeshir Ghovanloupour (IRI)	4.10
4	Alexander Tsui (HKG)	4.10
6	Wang Wei-chieh (TPE)	3.90
6	Norachai Boonnim (THA)	3.90
8	Cheng Tze Wang (HKG)	3.80
9	Nik Suhaily Bahari (MAS)	3.60
—	Takeshi Yasutoko (JPN)	DNS
—	Hung Chien-kai (TPE)	DNS

==== Park ====
17–18 November

Rank	Athlete	Prel.	Final
1st place, gold medalist(s)	Worapoj Boonnim (THA)	87.00	90.00
2nd place, silver medalist(s)	Jeerasak Tassorn (THA)	86.67	85.00
3rd place, bronze medalist(s)	Wang Wei-chieh (TPE)	57.33	74.00
4	Hung Chien-kai (TPE)	67.00	73.00
5	Alexander Tsui (HKG)	57.67	67.67
6	Zhang Chi (CHN)	58.33	66.00
7	Nasrul Afiq Mansor (MAS)	54.00	64.33
8	Ardeshir Ghovanloupour (IRI)	57.00	62.00
9	Cheng Tze Wang (HKG)	46.67	57.00
10	Nik Suhaily Bahari (MAS)	44.00	54.00
11	Nguyễn Văn An (VIE)	34.33	51.33
12	Lữ Hoàng Sỹ Khánh (VIE)	35.67	48.67
—	Zhang Hekai (CHN)	DNS	
—	Takeshi Yasutoko (JPN)	DNS	

==== Park best trick ====
19 November

Rank	Athlete
1st place, gold medalist(s)	Jeerasak Tassorn (THA)
2nd place, silver medalist(s)	Hung Chien-kai (TPE)
3rd place, bronze medalist(s)	Worapoj Boonnim (THA)
4	Lữ Hoàng Sỹ Khánh (VIE)
4	Nasrul Afiq Mansor (MAS)
4	Cheng Tze Wang (HKG)
4	Nguyễn Văn An (VIE)
4	Nik Suhaily Bahari (MAS)
4	Zhang Chi (CHN)
4	Ardeshir Ghovanloupour (IRI)
4	Wang Wei-chieh (TPE)
4	Alexander Tsui (HKG)
4	Zhang Hekai (CHN)

=== Skateboarding ===
==== Park ====
18–20 November

Rank	Athlete	Prel.	Final
1st place, gold medalist(s)	Johnnie Tang (HKG)	73.67	78.00
2nd place, silver medalist(s)	Athiwat Rueangsri (THA)	71.00	77.67
3rd place, bronze medalist(s)	Liu Jiaming (CHN)	78.00	76.67
4	Fikri Zulkifly (MAS)	77.67	75.67
5	Luk Chun Yin (HKG)	77.00	75.67
6	Shah Alif Suhaimi (MAS)	68.00	75.33
7	Sutat Siriwat (THA)	80.67	72.67
8	Mohammad Javad Rahimi (IRI)	65.33	71.33
9	Trịnh Đình Thời (VIE)	62.33	64.67
—	Che Lin (CHN)	DNS	

==== Park best trick ====
20 November

Rank	Athlete
1st place, gold medalist(s)	Pakorn Panutai (THA)
2nd place, silver medalist(s)	Wang Guohua (CHN)
3rd place, bronze medalist(s)	Napat Wijidjarung (THA)
4	Liu Jiaming (CHN)
5	Fikri Zulkifly (MAS)
6	Luk Chun Yin (HKG)
7	Johnnie Tang (HKG)
8	Mohammad Javad Rahimi (IRI)
9	Shah Alif Suhaimi (MAS)

==== Game of Skate ====
1/8 finals 17 November
Trịnh Đình Thời (VIE)	SKATE
Che Lin (CHN)	SKAT
Johnnie Tang (HKG)	—
Mohammad Javad Rahimi (IRI)	SKATE

Quarterfinals; 17 November
Luk Chun Yin (HKG)	SK
Che Lin (CHN)	SKATE
Apipol Posri (THA)	—
Shah Alif Suhaimi (MAS)	SKATE
Wang Guohua (CHN)	SKATE
Sutat Siriwat (THA)	SK
Fikri Zulkifly (MAS)	SKATE
Johnnie Tang (HKG)	SK

Semifinals; 19 November
Luk Chun Yin (HKG)	SK
Apipol Posri (THA)	SKATE
Sutat Siriwat (THA)	S
Johnnie Tang (HKG)	SKATE

Gold medal match 19 November
Luk Chun Yin (HKG)	S
Sutat Siriwat (THA)	SKATE
Bronze medal match
Apipol Posri (THA)	SKATE
Johnnie Tang (HKG)	SKAT
