= China at the 2014 Asian Beach Games =

- IOC code: CHN
- NOC: Chinese Olympic Committee external link (in Chinese and English)

in Phuket
- Competitors: 203 (124 men & 79 women) in 20 sports
- Medals Ranked 2nd: Gold 16 Silver 11 Bronze 21 Total 48

Asian Beach Games appearances
- 2008; 2010; 2012; 2014; 2016; 2026

China participated in the 2014 Asian Beach Games in Phuket, Thailand from 14 to 23 November 2014.

== Competitors ==
Sport	Men	Women	Total
Air sports	9	1	10
Beach Basketball	4	4	8
Beach Flag Football	10	0	10
Beach Handball	3	11	14
Beach Soccer	15	0	15
Marathon Swimming	4	3	7
Petanque	4	7	11
Sport Climbing	3	3	6
Squash	2	2	4
Triathlon	4	4	8
Beach Woodball	10	10	20
Total	68	45	113

== Medal summary ==
=== Medal by sport ===
Medals by sport
Sport	1st place, gold medalist(s)	2nd place, silver medalist(s)	3rd place, bronze medalist(s)	Total
Air Sports	0	0	1	1
Beach Basketball	0	1	0	1
Beach Flag Football	0	0	1	1
Beach Modern Pentathlon	1	2	1	4
Beach Sepaktakraw	0	0	1	1
Bodybuilding	1	0	1	2
Extreme Sports	1	2	1	4
Marathon Swimming	3	2	1	6
Muaythai	0	1	1	2
Petanque	0	0	2	2
Sailing / Windsurfing	5	1	2	8
Sport Climbing	1	1	0	2
Squash	0	0	1	1
Triathlon	0	1	2	3
WaterSki	4	0	1	5
Beach Woodball	0	0	5	5
Total	16	11	21	48

=== Medal by Date ===
Medals by date
Day	Date	1st place, gold medalist(s)	2nd place, silver medalist(s)	3rd place, bronze medalist(s)	Total
–1	12 Nov	0	0	0	0
0	13 Nov	0	0	1	1
1	14 Nov	0	0	0	0
2	15 Nov	1	2	2	5
3	16 Nov	2	0	2	4
4	17 Nov	2	2	4	8
5	18 Nov	0	1	3	4
6	19 Nov	0	0	1	1
7	20 Nov	10	4	5	19
8	21 Nov	0	1	1	2
9	22 Nov	1	1	2	4
10	23 Nov	0	0	0	0
Total		16	11	21	48
