= Hong Kong at the 2014 Asian Beach Games =

- IOC code: HKG
- NOC: Sports Federation and Olympic Committee of Hong Kong, China

in Phuket
- Medals Ranked 14th: Gold 3 Silver 2 Bronze 7 Total 12

Asian Beach Games appearances
- 2008; 2010; 2012; 2014; 2016; 2026

Hong Kong participated in the 2014 Asian Beach Games in Phuket, Thailand from 14 to 23 November 2014.

== Medalists ==
Medal	Name	Sport	Event	Date
Gold	Johnnie Tang	Roller sports	Skateboarding - Park	20 November
Gold	Luk Chun Yin	Roller sports	Skateboarding - Game of Skate	19 November
Gold	Liu Tsz Ling	Squash	Women's singles	16 November
Silver	Yip Tsz Fung	Squash	Men's singles	16 November
Silver	Tong Tsz Wing	Squash	Women's singles	16 November
Bronze	Fiona Chan	Open water swimming	Women's 10km	17 November
Bronze	Yiu Kit Ching	Beach athletics	Women's cross-country	21 November
Bronze	Johnnie Tang	Roller sports	Skateboarding - Game of Skate	20 November
Bronze	Chin Ngai Chung	Muaythai	Men's Light welterweight	19 November
Bronze	Wu Hoi Yan	Muaythai	Women's Light flyweight	19 November
Bronze	Lee Chun Ting	Sailing	Men's RS:X	21 November

Medals by sport
Sport	1st place, gold medalist(s)	2nd place, silver medalist(s)	3rd place, bronze medalist(s)	Total
Beach Athletics	0	0	1	1
Roller sports	2	0	1	3
Open water swimming	0	0	1	1
Muaythai	0	0	2	2
Sailing / Windsurfing	0	0	1	1
Squash	1	2	0	3
Triathlon	0	0	1	1
Total	3	2	7	12

Medals by day
Day	1st place, gold medalist(s)	2nd place, silver medalist(s)	3rd place, bronze medalist(s)	Total
12 Nov	0	0	0	0
13 Nov	0	0	0	0
14 Nov	0	0	0	0
15 Nov	0	0	0	0
16 Nov	1	2	0	3
17 Nov	0	0	2	2
18 Nov	0	0	0	0
19 Nov	1	0	2	3
20 Nov	1	0	1	2
21 Nov	0	0	2	2
22 Nov	0	0	0	0
23 Nov	0	0	0	0
Total	3	2	7	12

== Beach water polo ==
Hong Kong went 0-1-4 against all the other teams, finishing 6th place.

== Open water swimming ==
- Fiona Chan, Women's 5km (7th)
- Claudia Wong, Women's 5km (8th)
- Fiona Chan, Women's 10km (3rd)
- Tiffany Lee, Women's 10km (6th)
- Winson Lee, Men's 5km (10th)
- Li Chun Hong, Men's 5km (12th)
- Hui Chun Hin, Men's 10km (9th)
- Singha Chau, Men's 10km (12th)

== Beach athletics ==
- Yiu Kit Ching, Women's cross-country 6km (3rd)
- Wan Cheuk Hei, Men's cross-country (DNF)
- Lam Wai, Men's short put (7th)

== Beach handball ==
Hong Kong men's team went 0-4 in Group A and was eliminated in group stage. They later defeated Bangladesh and India in placement matches to finish 9th overall. The women's team went 2-2 in Group B, just fell short of qualifying at 3rd place. They defeated Turkmenistan, but lost to Japan in placement, finishing 6th overall.

== Roller sports ==
=== Roller freestyle ===
- Alexander Tsui, Big air (4th)
- Cheng Tze Wang, Big air (8th)
- Alexander Tsui, Park (5th)
- Cheng Tze Wang, Park (9th)
- Cheng Tze Wang, Park best trick (4th)
- Alexander Tsui, Park best trick (4th)

=== Skateboarding ===
- Johnnie Tang, Park (1st)
- Luk Chun Yin, Park (5th)
- Luk Chun Yin, Park best trick (6th)
- Johnnie Tang, Park best trick (7th)
- Luk Chun Yin, Game of Skate (1st)
- Johnnie Tang, Game of Skate (3rd)

== Muaythai ==
- Chan Kai Tik, Men's Light flyweight (5-7th)
- Ho Kwok Keung, Men's Flyweight (5-8th)
- Chin Ngai Chung, Men's Light welterweight (3rd)
- Wu Hoi Yan, Women's Light flyweight (3rd)

== Sailing ==
- Cheng Ho Yin, Men's RS:One (5th)
- Chan Tsz Kit, Men's RS:One (9th)
- Lee Chun Ting, Men's RS:X (3rd)
- Rafeek Kikabhoy, Men's RS:X (5th)
- Sandy Choi, Women's RS:One (6th)
- Chan Yau Ching, Women's RS:One (9th)
- Ma Kwan Ching, Women's RS:X (4th)
- Tong Yui Shing, Tong Kit Fong, Open Hobie 16 (4th)

== Squash ==
- Yip Tsz Fung, Men's singles (2nd)
- Wong Chi Him, Men's singles (5-8th)
- Liu Tsz Ling, Women's singles (1st)
- Tong Tsz Wing, Women's singles (2nd)

== Triathlon ==
- Leanne Szeto, Women's Duathlon (DNS)
- Perry Wong, Men's Triathlon (8th)
- Law Leong Tim, Men's Triathlon (10th)
- Hilda Choi, Women's Triathlon (8th)
- Hilda Choi, Perry Wong, Leanne Szeto, Wong Hui Wai, Mixed relay (3rd)
