= Malaysia at the 2014 Asian Beach Games =

- IOC code: MAS
- NOC: Olympic Council of Malaysia
- Website: www.olympic.org.my (in English)

in Phuket
- Medals Ranked 27th: Gold 0 Silver 8 Bronze 8 Total 16

Asian Beach Games appearances
- 2008; 2010; 2012; 2014; 2016; 2026

Malaysia participated in the 2014 Asian Beach Games in Phuket, Thailand from 14 to 23 November 2014.

== Medal summary ==
=== Medal by sport ===
Medals by sport
Sport	1st place, gold medalist(s)	2nd place, silver medalist(s)	3rd place, bronze medalist(s)	Total
Extreme Sports	0	1	1	2
Foot Volley	0	0	1	1
Muaythai	0	0	3	3
Petanque	0	3	3	6
Sailing / Windsurfing	0	3	0	3
WaterSki	0	1	0	1
Total	0	8	8	16

=== Medal by Date ===
Medals by date
Day	Date	1st place, gold medalist(s)	2nd place, silver medalist(s)	3rd place, bronze medalist(s)	Total
–1	12 Nov	0	0	0	0
0	13 Nov	0	0	0	0
1	14 Nov	0	0	0	0
2	15 Nov	0	0	1	1
3	16 Nov	0	1	2	3
4	17 Nov	0	0	0	0
5	18 Nov	0	2	1	3
6	19 Nov	0	0	1	1
7	20 Nov	0	5	1	6
8	21 Nov	0	0	2	2
9	22 Nov	0	0	0	0
10	23 Nov	0	0	0	0
Total		0	8	8	16
