= Chinese Taipei at the 2014 Asian Beach Games =

- IOC code: TPE
- NOC: Chinese Taipei Olympic Committee

in Phuket
- Medals Ranked 13th: Gold 3 Silver 8 Bronze 6 Total 17

Asian Beach Games appearances
- 2008; 2010; 2012; 2014; 2016; 2026

Flag of the Republic of China

Chinese Taipei participated in the 2014 Asian Beach Games in Phuket, Thailand from 14 to 23 November 2014.

== Medal summary ==
=== Medal by sport ===
Medals by sport
Sport	1st place, gold medalist(s)	2nd place, silver medalist(s)	3rd place, bronze medalist(s)	Total
Beach Basketball	1	0	0	1
Beach Handball	0	1	0	1
Beach Woodball	0	3	2	5
Extreme Sports	1	1	3	5
Kurash	1	2	1	4
Triathlon	0	1	0	1
Total	3	8	6	17

=== Medal by Date ===
Medals by date
Day	Date	1st place, gold medalist(s)	2nd place, silver medalist(s)	3rd place, bronze medalist(s)	Total
–1	12 Nov	0	0	0	0
0	13 Nov	0	0	0	0
1	14 Nov	0	0	0	0
2	15 Nov	0	3	0	3
3	16 Nov	1	0	1	2
4	17 Nov	0	1	1	2
5	18 Nov	1	2	2	5
6	19 Nov	0	1	2	3
7	20 Nov	1	0	0	1
8	21 Nov	0	0	0	0
9	22 Nov	0	1	0	1
10	23 Nov	0	0	0	0
Total		3	8	6	17
