= India at the 2014 Asian Beach Games =

- IOC code: IND
- NOC: Indian Olympic Association
- Website: olympic.ind.in (in English)

in Phuket
- Medals Ranked 20th: Gold 2 Silver 1 Bronze 7 Total 10

Asian Beach Games appearances
- 2008; 2010; 2012; 2014; 2016; 2026

India participated in the 2014 Asian Beach Games in Phuket, Thailand from 14 to 23 November 2014.

== Medal summary ==
=== Medal by sport ===
Medals by sport
Sport	1st place, gold medalist(s)	2nd place, silver medalist(s)	3rd place, bronze medalist(s)	Total
Beach Basketball	0	1	0	1
Beach Kabaddi	1	0	1	2
Beach Sepaktakraw	0	0	2	2
Kurash	0	0	1	1
Muaythai	0	0	1	1
Squash	1	0	2	3
Total	2	1	7	10

=== Medal by Date ===
Medals by date
Day	Date	1st place, gold medalist(s)	2nd place, silver medalist(s)	3rd place, bronze medalist(s)	Total
–1	12 Nov	0	0	0	0
0	13 Nov	0	0	0	0
1	14 Nov	0	0	0	0
2	15 Nov	0	0	2	2
3	16 Nov	1	0	0	1
4	17 Nov	0	0	2	2
5	18 Nov	0	1	0	1
6	19 Nov	0	0	0	0
7	20 Nov	0	0	2	2
8	21 Nov	0	0	0	0
9	22 Nov	0	0	1	1
10	23 Nov	1	0	0	1
Total		2	1	7	10
