= List of Asian Beach Games medalists for Indonesia =

Asian Beach Games medalists for Indonesia

This is a list of Indonesian medalists at the Asian Beach Games. For more information about Indonesian participation at the Asian Beach Games, see Indonesia at the Asian Beach Games.

== Medalists ==
=== Beach Athletics ===
Medal	Name	Event	Games
Gold	Iswandi	Men's 60 m	2014 Asian Beach Games
Silver	Lismawati Illang; Aprilia Kartina; Triyani Pamungkas	Women's cross-country team	2014 Asian Beach Games
Bronze	Triyani Pamungkas; Aprilia Kartina; Lismawati Illang; Serafi Anelies Unani	Women's 4x60 m relay	2014 Asian Beach Games

=== Beach Kabaddi ===
Medal	Name	Event	Games
Bronze	Ni Luh Putu Indrawathi; Ni Luh Putu Risstya; Ni Putu Soma Apriantini; Desak Made Agustin Dewi; Ni Komang Ariningsih; Ni Made Sridevi	Women	2008 Asian Beach Games
Bronze	Ni Made Sridevi; Ni Komang Ariningsih; Ni Luh Putu Risstya; Ni Putu Soma Apriantini; Desak Made Agustin Dewi; Ni Ketut Puspasari	Women	2008 Asian Beach Games

=== Beach Sepak Takraw ===
Medal	Name	Event	Games
Silver	Indonesia	Women's team regu	2008 Asian Beach Games
Silver	Saiyed Nur Adil; Alfin Alim; Sugeng Arifin; Suko Hartono; Haris Munandar; Rizky Abdul Rahman Pago; Hendra Pago; Andi Paturay; Abdul Halim Radjiu; Wisnu Dwi Suhantoro; Husni Uba; Yovi Hendra Utama	Men's team regu	2012 Asian Beach Games
Silver	Nofrizal; Syamsul Akmal; Hendra Pago; Muhammad Ruswan Wajib; Victoria Eka Prasetyo; Firmansyah	Men's regu	2014 Asian Beach Games
Bronze	Indonesia	Men's team regu	2008 Asian Beach Games
Bronze	Indonesia	Women's regu	2008 Asian Beach Games
Bronze	Rizky Abdul Rahman Pago; Haris Munandar; Sugeite Arifin; Zulkifli; Abdul Halim Radjiu; Alfin Alim; Yopi Hendra Utama; Brian Agung Pamungkas; Ali Fikri; Rohman Hidayat; Aris Ardianto; Akitirman	Men's team regu	2010 Asian Beach Games
Bronze	Sutini Binti Seni; Roslin Dida; Gallih Desiari; Ayu Lestari; Desi Indah Kurniasari; Indra Yuliasti	Women's regu	2010 Asian Beach Games
Bronze	Devya Sari; Sutini Binti Seni; Nina Karmila; Dwi Asih; Irma Wati; Roslin Dida; Gallih Desiari; Ayu Lestari; Lena; Desi Indah Kurniasari; Hasmawati Umar; Indra Yuliasti	Women's team regu	2010 Asian Beach Games
Bronze	Alfin Alim; Suko Hartono; Hendra Pago; Andi Paturay; Abdul Halim Radjiu; Husni Uba	Men's regu	2012 Asian Beach Games
Bronze	Seri Ayu Astuti; Gallih Desiari; Roslin Dida; Nur Hidayah; Jumasiah; Akyko Micheel Kapito; Nina Karmila; Ayu Lestari; Aliya Prihatini; Irma Wati; Nur Qadriyanti; Indra Yuliasti	Women's team regu	2012 Asian Beach Games
Bronze	Dini Mita Sari; Akyko Micheel Kapito; Widya Andrini Modjundju; Nur Isni Chikita Sumito; Kusnelia; Irma Wati	Women's regu	2014 Asian Beach Games
Bronze	Wisnu Dwi Suhantoro; Yudi Purnomo; Andi Paturay; Syaifudin; Arfin	Men's trios	2016 Asian Beach Games
Bronze	Wisnu Dwi Suhantoro; Yudi Purnomo; Andi Paturay; Syaifudin; Arfin	Men's regu	2016 Asian Beach Games

=== Beach Water Polo ===
Medal	Name	Event	Games
Silver	Novian Dwi Putra; Bradley Ignatius Legawa; Muhammad Rizki; Delvin Felliciano; Maulana Bayu Herfianto; Ridjkie Mulia Harahap; Reza Aditya Putra	Men's team	2016 Asian Beach Games
Bronze	Muhammad Zamri; Deni Novendra; Indrawan Ginting; Hendri Marcyano Raditya; Reza Aditya Putra; Heriansyah Saragih; Ridjkie Mulia Harahap; Maulana Bayu Herfianto	Men's team	2008 Asian Beach Games

=== Beach Volleyball ===
Medal	Name	Event	Games
Gold	Andy Ardiyansah; Koko Prasetyo Darkuncoro	Men	2008 Asian Beach Games
Gold	Ade Candra Rachmawan; Koko Prasetyo Darkuncoro	Men	2012 Asian Beach Games
Gold	Ade Candra Rachmawan; Koko Prasetyo Darkuncoro	Men	2014 Asian Beach Games
Bronze	Putu Dini Jasita Utami; Dhita Juliana	Women	2014 Asian Beach Games

=== Beach Wrestling ===
Medal	Name	Event	Games
Silver	Pahmi Pami Ginawan	Men's 65 kg	2008 Asian Beach Games
Bronze	Rudi Hariyanto	Men's 75 kg	2008 Asian Beach Games
Bronze	Nur Rusli	Men's 85 kg	2008 Asian Beach Games
Bronze	Heka Maya Sembiring	Women's 50 kg	2014 Asian Beach Games

=== Bodybuilding ===
Medal	Name	Event	Games
Gold	Asrelawandi	Men's 60 kg	2008 Asian Beach Games
Gold	Syafrizaldi	Men's 75 kg	2008 Asian Beach Games
Gold	Asrelawandi	Men's 60 kg	2010 Asian Beach Games
Gold	Syafrizaldi	Men's 75 kg	2010 Asian Beach Games

=== Coastal Rowing ===
Medal	Name	Event	Games
Gold	Chelsea Corputty	Women's solo	2016 Asian Beach Games
Silver	Yuniarti; Endang Sri Hevina; Wahyuni; Syiva Lisdiana; Wa Ode Fitri Rahmanjani	Women's coxed quadruple sculls	2016 Asian Beach Games
Bronze	Yayah Rokayah; Syiva Lisdiana	Women's double sculls	2016 Asian Beach Games

=== Dragon Boat ===
Medal	Name	Event	Games
Gold	Buce Zeth Monim; Jaslin; Weri Pebrianto; Gandi; Rahman Aju; Andri Sugiarto; Sven Stuber; Diyono; Ahmad Supriadi; Isdori; Asep Hidayat; Didin Rusdiana; Indra Yulius; Kuat; Asnawir; Eka Octarianus; Nursalam; Japerry Siregar; Vines Kambay; Anwar Tarra; Husni Hatuina; Jhon Matulessy; Ikhwan Randi; Iwan Husin; Abdul Azis; Spens Stuber Mehue; Ajurahman; Hardony	Men's 1000 m	2008 Asian Beach Games
Gold	Astri Dwijayanti; Nikmah Diana; Agustina Kabay; Itta Anggraini; Suhartati; Christina Kafolakari; Multi; Hartawan; Royani Rais; Salwiah; Sarce Aronggear; Hasnah; Masripah; Rasima; Yulanda Ester Entong; Suci Rahmayanti; Farida; Minawati; Siti Maryam; Yohana Yoce Yom; Since Lithasova Yom; Sere Pipit; Mintelda Ibo; Nurmila; Kanti Santyawati; Erni Sokoy	Women's 250 m	2008 Asian Beach Games
Gold	Astri Dwijayanti; Nikmah Diana; Agustina Kabay; Itta Anggraini; Suhartati; Christina Kafolakari; Multi; Hartawan; Royani Rais; Salwiah; Sarce Aronggear; Hasnah; Masripah; Rasima; Yulanda Ester Entong; Suci Rahmayanti; Farida; Minawati; Siti Maryam; Yohana Yoce Yom; Since Lithasova Yom; Sere Pipit; Mintelda Ibo; Nurmila; Kanti Santyawati; Erni Sokoy	Women's 500 m	2008 Asian Beach Games
Gold	Astri Dwijayanti; Nikmah Diana; Agustina Kabay; Itta Anggraini; Suhartati; Christina Kafolakari; Multi; Hartawan; Royani Rais; Salwiah; Sarce Aronggear; Hasnah; Masripah; Rasima; Yulanda Ester Entong; Suci Rahmayanti; Farida; Minawati; Siti Maryam; Yohana Yoce Yom; Since Lithasova Yom; Sere Pipit; Mintelda Ibo; Nurmila; Kanti Santyawati; Erni Sokoy	Women's 1000 m	2008 Asian Beach Games
Gold	Gandi; Asep Hidayat; Jaslin; Marjuki; John Feter Matulessy; Jefklin Mehue; Spens Stuber Mehue; Erwin David Monim; Muchlis; Andri Agus Mulyana; Silo; Rusmin Sina; Sutrisno; Dedi Kurniawan Suyatno; Anwar Tarra; Wardi	Men's 200 m	2012 Asian Beach Games
Gold	Gandi; Asep Hidayat; Jaslin; Marjuki; John Feter Matulessy; Jefklin Mehue; Spens Stuber Mehue; Erwin David Monim; Muchlis; Andri Agus Mulyana; Silo; Rusmin Sina; Sutrisno; Dedi Kurniawan Suyatno; Anwar Tarra; Wardi	Men's 500 m	2012 Asian Beach Games
Gold	Gandi; Asep Hidayat; Jaslin; Marjuki; John Feter Matulessy; Jefklin Mehue; Spens Stuber Mehue; Erwin David Monim; Muchlis; Andri Agus Mulyana; Silo; Rusmin Sina; Sutrisno; Dedi Kurniawan Suyatno; Anwar Tarra; Wardi	Men's 3000 m	2012 Asian Beach Games
Gold	Yaulana Amalia; Dayumin; Nikmah Diana; Yulanda Ester Entong; Seni Gantiani; Yunita Kadop; Siti Maryam; Maryati; Masripah; Sesni Lavenia Monim; Nurhalimah; Ririn Nur Paridah; Kanti Santyawati; Vioditha Cristy Sokoy; Since Litashova Yom; Riana Yulistrian	Women's 3000 m	2012 Asian Beach Games
Silver	Buce Zeth Monim; Jaslin; Weri Pebrianto; Gandi; Rahman Aju; Andri Sugiarto; Sven Stuber; Diyono; Ahmad Supriadi; Isdori; Asep Hidayat; Didin Rusdiana; Indra Yulius; Kuat; Asnawir; Eka Octarianus; Nursalam; Japerry Siregar; Vines Kambay; Anwar Tarra; Husni Hatuina; Jhon Matulessy; Ikhwan Randi; Iwan Husin; Abdul Azis; Spens Stuber Mehue; Ajurahman; Hardony	Men's 250 m	2008 Asian Beach Games
Silver	Buce Zeth Monim; Jaslin; Weri Pebrianto; Gandi; Rahman Aju; Andri Sugiarto; Sven Stuber; Diyono; Ahmad Supriadi; Isdori; Asep Hidayat; Didin Rusdiana; Indra Yulius; Kuat; Asnawir; Eka Octarianus; Nursalam; Japerry Siregar; Vines Kambay; Anwar Tarra; Husni Hatuina; Jhon Matulessy; Ikhwan Randi; Iwan Husin; Abdul Azis; Spens Stuber Mehue; Ajurahman; Hardony	Men's 500 m	2008 Asian Beach Games
Silver	Yaulana Amalia; Dayumin; Nikmah Diana; Yulanda Ester Entong; Seni Gantiani; Yunita Kadop; Siti Maryam; Maryati; Masripah; Sesni Lavenia Monim; Nurhalimah; Ririn Nur Paridah; Kanti Santyawati; Vioditha Cristy Sokoy; Since Litashova Yom; Riana Yulistrian	Women's 200 m	2012 Asian Beach Games
Silver	Yaulana Amalia; Dayumin; Nikmah Diana; Yulanda Ester Entong; Seni Gantiani; Yunita Kadop; Siti Maryam; Maryati; Masripah; Sesni Lavenia Monim; Nurhalimah; Ririn Nur Paridah; Kanti Santyawati; Vioditha Cristy Sokoy; Since Litashova Yom; Riana Yulistrian	Women's 500 m	2012 Asian Beach Games

=== Jet Ski ===
Medal	Name	Event	Games
Gold	Aero Sutan Aswar	Runabout endurance open	2010 Asian Beach Games
Gold	Aqsa Sutan Aswar	Runabout stock	2014 Asian Beach Games
Gold	Aero Sutan Aswar	Runabout endurance open	2014 Asian Beach Games
Silver	Aero Sutan Aswar	Runabout stock	2014 Asian Beach Games
Bronze	Rocky Soerapoetra	Runabout open	2008 Asian Beach Games
Bronze	Temmy Fitramsyah Iskandar	Runabout endurance open	2008 Asian Beach Games
Bronze	Irwansyah Adi Pratama	Ski open	2008 Asian Beach Games
Bronze	Aero Sutan Aswar	Runabout open	2014 Asian Beach Games
Bronze	Aqsa Sutan Aswar	Runabout endurance open	2014 Asian Beach Games

=== Open Water Swimming ===
Medal	Name	Event	Games
Silver	Yessy Yosaputra	Women's 10 km	2010 Asian Beach Games
Bronze	Maximillan Manurung	Men's 10 km	2008 Asian Beach Games

=== Paragliding / Paramotoring ===
Medal	Name	Event	Games
Gold	Nanang Sunarya	Men's individual accuracy	2008 Asian Beach Games
Gold	Dyan Apriyanti	Women's individual accuracy	2008 Asian Beach Games
Gold	Lis Andriana; Dyan Apriyanti; Dian Rosnalia; Milawati Sirin; Nofrica Yanti	Women's team accuracy	2008 Asian Beach Games
Gold	Thomas Widyananto	Men's individual cross-country	2008 Asian Beach Games
Gold	Teguh Maryanto; Nanang Sunarya; Acep Suparya; Tony Yudantoro Suwono; Thomas Widyananto	Men's team cross-country	2008 Asian Beach Games
Gold	Milawati Sirin	Women's individual cross-country	2008 Asian Beach Games
Gold	Lis Andriana; Dyan Apriyanti; Dian Rosnalia; Milawati Sirin; Nofrica Yanti	Women's team cross-country	2008 Asian Beach Games
Gold	Thomas Widyananto	Men's individual accuracy	2014 Asian Beach Games
Silver	Dian Rosnalia	Women's individual accuracy	2008 Asian Beach Games
Silver	Joni Efendi; Ardi Kurniawan; Darumaka Rajasa; Dede Supratman; Thomas Widyananto	Men's team accuracy	2014 Asian Beach Games
Silver	Lis Andriana; Ifa Kurniawati; Rika Wijayanti; Ike Ayu Wulandari; Nofrica Yanti	Women's team accuracy	2014 Asian Beach Games
Bronze	Milawati Sirin	Women's individual accuracy	2008 Asian Beach Games
Bronze	Teguh Maryanto	Men's individual cross-country	2008 Asian Beach Games
Bronze	Priya Jatmiko Agung; Mukhammad Akbar; Hening Paradigma; Bambang Santoso; Thomas Widyananto	Team combined	2012 Asian Beach Games
Bronze	Lis Andriana	Women's individual accuracy	2014 Asian Beach Games

=== Pencak Silat ===
Medal	Name	Event	Games
Gold	I Gusti Ngurah Arya Yudapandita	Men's tunggal	2008 Asian Beach Games
Gold	Dani Hamdani; Yusuf Effendi	Men's ganda	2008 Asian Beach Games
Gold	Ni Luh Putu Spyanawati	Women's tunggal	2008 Asian Beach Games
Gold	Ni Made Dwiyanti; Sang Ayu Ketut	Women's ganda	2008 Asian Beach Games
Gold	Ni Nyoman Suparniti	Women's tanding class D 60–65 kg	2008 Asian Beach Games
Silver	Dino Bima Sulistianto	Men's tunggal	2016 Asian Beach Games
Silver	Haidir Agung Falatehan; Dede Setiadi	Men's ganda	2016 Asian Beach Games
Silver	Alan Sanjaya	Men's tanding class G 75–80	2016 Asian Beach Games
Bronze	Diyan Kristianto	Men's tanding class A 45–50 kg	2008 Asian Beach Games
Bronze	Ria Puspita Sari	Women's tanding class A 45–50 kg	2008 Asian Beach Games
Bronze	Deny Aprisani	Men's tanding class C 55-60 kg	2016 Asian Beach Games
Bronze	Fransiska Sandra Dewi	Women's tanding class C 55-60 kg	2016 Asian Beach Games

=== Sailing ===
Medal	Name	Event	Games
Gold	Oka Sulaksana	Men's mistral heavy	2008 Asian Beach Games
Bronze	Ario Dipo; Yoseph Udjulawa	Open Hobie 16	2008 Asian Beach Games

=== Sport Climbing ===
Medal	Name	Event	Games
Gold	Galar Pandu Asmoro; Tonny Mamiri; Rindi Sufriyanto	Men's speed relay	2012 Asian Beach Games
Gold	Aspar Jaelolo	Men's speed	2014 Asian Beach Games
Gold	Desak Made Rita Kusuma Dewi; Kadek Adi Asih	Women's speed relay	2026 Asian Beach Games
Silver	Rindi Sufriyanto	Men's speed	2012 Asian Beach Games
Silver	Evi Neliwati; Ita Triana Purnamasari; Tita Supita	Women's speed relay	2012 Asian Beach Games
Silver	Santy Wellyanti; Ita Triana Purnamasari; Tita Supita	Women's speed relay	2014 Asian Beach Games
Silver	Antasyafi Robby Al Hilmi	Men's speed individual	2026 Asian Beach Games
Silver	Antasyafi Robby Al Hilmi; Raharjati Nursamsa	Men's speed relay	2026 Asian Beach Games
Bronze	Evi Neliwati	Women's speed	2012 Asian Beach Games
Bronze	Fajri Ashari; Aspar Jaelolo; Nanang Ibrahim	Men's speed relay	2014 Asian Beach Games
Bronze	Tita Supita	Women's speed	2014 Asian Beach Games

=== Surfing ===
Medal	Name	Event	Games
Gold	I Made Widiarta	Men's shortboard	2008 Asian Beach Games
Gold	Dede Suryana	Men's aerial	2008 Asian Beach Games
Gold	I Made Widiarta; I Made Raditya Rondi; Dede Suryana; Made Adi Putra	Mixed team	2008 Asian Beach Games
Silver	I Made Raditya Rondi	Men's shortboard	2008 Asian Beach Games
Silver	Gea Yasniar	Women's shortboard	2008 Asian Beach Games
Bronze	Wayan Widana	Men's longboard	2008 Asian Beach Games
Bronze	Ridwan Husni	Men's longboard	2008 Asian Beach Games
Bronze	Made Adi Putra	Men's aerial	2008 Asian Beach Games
Bronze	Dewi Diah Rahayu	Women's shortboard	2008 Asian Beach Games

=== Vovinam ===
Medal	Name	Event	Games
Gold	Manik Trisna Dewi Wetan	Women's dragon-tiger form	2016 Asian Beach Games

=== Water Skiing ===
Medal	Name	Event	Games
Silver	Febrianto Kadir	Men's tricks	2014 Asian Beach Games
Bronze	Maliki Zulkarnain	Men's tricks	2010 Asian Beach Games
Bronze	Maliki Zulkarnain; Nur Akbar Imansyah; Andri Muhamad Febiandi; Inawati Setiawan; Dini Imaniar	Team overall trick skiing	2010 Asian Beach Games
Bronze	Maliki Zulkarnain	Men's tricks	2012 Asian Beach Games
Bronze	Ummu Thoyibhatus Sholikah	Women's slalom	2014 Asian Beach Games
Bronze	Indra Hardinata; Febrianto Kadir; Dimas Ridho Suprihono; Galuh Mutiara Maulidina; Nur Alimah Priambodo; Ummu Thoyibhatus Sholikah	Team overall skiing	2014 Asian Beach Games

=== Woodball ===
Medal	Name	Event	Games
Gold	Dwi Tiga Putri	Women's singles fairway	2014 Asian Beach Games
Gold	Ahris Sumaryanto	Men's singles stroke	2016 Asian Beach Games
Silver	Kriswantoro; Ahris Sumaryanto; Bambang Sulistyo; Sutarno; Masrun; Martius Bungan	Men's team	2010 Asian Beach Games
Bronze	Ika Yulianingsih; Setyani Aris; Ismini; Sukiyanti; Kartini; Panji Rahayu Yeni	Women's team	2008 Asian Beach Games
Bronze	Ahris Sumaryanto	Men's singles fairway	2014 Asian Beach Games
Bronze	Marga Nugraha Susilo	Men's singles fairway	2014 Asian Beach Games
Bronze	Putu Budhiyasa; Khoirul Mustakhim; Gede Riska Sanjaya; Ahris Sumaryanto; Marga Nugraha Susilo; Wisnu Wicaksono	Men's team stroke	2016 Asian Beach Games
Bronze	Ika Yulianingsih	Women's singles stroke	2016 Asian Beach Games
Bronze	Dwi Tiga Putri	Women's singles fairway	2016 Asian Beach Games
Bronze	Ni Putu Devianasari	Women's singles fairway	2016 Asian Beach Games

== Podium sweeps ==
Year	Sport	Event	Gold	Silver	Bronze
2008	Paragliding	Women's individual accuracy	Dyan Apriyanti	Dian Rosnalia	Milawati Sirin

== See also ==
- List of Asian Games medalists for Indonesia
