= Open water swimming at the 2014 Asian Beach Games =

- Venue: Karon Beach
- Dates: 15–17 November 2014

Open water swimming competition at the 2014 Asian Beach Games was held in Phuket, Thailand from 15 to 17 November 2014 at Karon Beach.

== Medalists ==
=== Men ===
Event	Gold	Silver	Bronze
5 km	Vitaliy Khudyakov; Kazakhstan	Qiao Zhongyi; China	Saleh Mohammad; Syria
10 km	Zu Lijun; China	Vitaliy Khudyakov; Kazakhstan	Saleh Mohammad; Syria

=== Women ===
Event	Gold	Silver	Bronze
5 km	Shi Yu; China	Benjaporn Sriphanomthorn; Thailand	Fang Yanqiao; China
10 km	Fang Yanqiao; China	Cao Shiyue; China	Fiona Chan; Hong Kong

== Medal table ==
Rank	Nation	Gold	Silver	Bronze	Total
1	China (CHN)	3	2	1	6
2	Kazakhstan (KAZ)	1	1	0	2
3	Thailand (THA)	0	1	0	1
4	Syria (SYR)	0	0	2	2
5	Hong Kong (HKG)	0	0	1	1
Totals (5 entries)		4	4	4	12

== Results ==
=== Men ===
==== 5 km ====
15 November

Rank	Athlete	Time
1st place, gold medalist(s)	Vitaliy Khudyakov (KAZ)	58:39.5
2nd place, silver medalist(s)	Qiao Zhongyi (CHN)	58:41.2
3rd place, bronze medalist(s)	Saleh Mohammad (SYR)	58:49.6
4	Lang Yuanpeng (CHN)	59:43.7
5	Khalid Al-Kulaibi (OMA)	59:47.0
6	Vladimir Tolikin (KAZ)	1:00:07.9
7	Aflah Fadlan Prawira (INA)	1:02:44.6
8	Peerapat Lertsathapornsuk (THA)	1:02:47.0
9	Châu Bá Anh Tư (VIE)	1:02:47.4
10	Winson Lee (HKG)	1:05:38.4
11	Musallam Al-Khadhuri (OMA)	1:07:17.5
12	Li Chun Hong (HKG)	1:07:19.1
13	Farhan Saleh Farhan (BRN)	1:11:47.7
14	Khaled Ismaeel (BRN)	1:11:48.4
15	Mahmudun Nabi (BAN)	1:18:09.2
16	Hassan Ashraf (MDV)	1:32:16.8
—	Hussain Anwar (MDV)	DNF
—	Jiarapong Sangkhawat (THA)	DNF
—	Marzouq Al-Salem (KUW)	DNS
—	Abdullah Al-Bader (KUW)	DNS

==== 10 km ====
17 November

Rank	Athlete	Time
1st place, gold medalist(s)	Zu Lijun (CHN)	2:01:43.1
2nd place, silver medalist(s)	Vitaliy Khudyakov (KAZ)	2:02:13.3
3rd place, bronze medalist(s)	Saleh Mohammad (SYR)	2:02:14.3
4	Zhang Zibin (CHN)	2:07:07.0
5	Trần Tấn Triệu (VIE)	2:10:24.0
6	Thanath Jesdakham (THA)	2:10:27.0
7	Vladimir Tolikin (KAZ)	2:10:36.7
8	Ricky Anggawijaya (INA)	2:19:15.6
9	Hui Chun Hin (HKG)	2:19:16.6
10	Aiman Al-Qasimi (OMA)	2:21:50.9
11	Mohammed Al-Habsi (OMA)	2:24:38.0
12	Singha Chau (HKG)	2:27:47.2
—	Faraj Saleh Farhan (BRN)	DNF
—	Khaled Ismaeel (BRN)	DNF
—	Peerapat Lertsathapornsuk (THA)	DNF
—	Ahmad Al-Bader (KUW)	DNS
—	Mohammad Al-Khandari (KUW)	DNS

=== Women ===
==== 5 km ====
15 November

Rank	Athlete	Time
1st place, gold medalist(s)	Shi Yu (CHN)	59:49.3
2nd place, silver medalist(s)	Benjaporn Sriphanomthorn (THA)	59:52.5
3rd place, bronze medalist(s)	Fang Yanqiao (CHN)	59:52.7
4	Sarisa Suwannachet (THA)	1:00:04.0
5	Xeniya Romanchuk (KAZ)	1:00:50.1
6	Lê Thị Mỹ Thảo (VIE)	1:01:10.8
7	Fiona Chan (HKG)	1:06:18.8
8	Claudia Wong (HKG)	1:06:39.1
9	Raina Saumi Grahana (INA)	1:06:43.2
10	Yessy Yosaputra (INA)	1:06:51.2
11	Anna Gakhokidze (KAZ)	1:12:02.6
—	Bayan Jumah (SYR)	DNF

==== 10 km ====
17 November

Rank	Athlete	Time
1st place, gold medalist(s)	Fang Yanqiao (CHN)	2:16:12.1
2nd place, silver medalist(s)	Cao Shiyue (CHN)	2:16:40.3
3rd place, bronze medalist(s)	Fiona Chan (HKG)	2:17:45.7
4	Xeniya Romanchuk (KAZ)	2:17:56.3
5	Ammiga Himathongkom (THA)	2:21:50.3
6	Tiffany Lee (HKG)	2:28:32.7
7	Diana Shum (KAZ)	2:33:32.9
—	Pornsuda Viniyompong (THA)	DNF
—	Lê Thị Mỹ Thảo (VIE)	DNF
—	Ressa Kania Dewi (INA)	DSQ
—	Trần Thị Hồng Cẩm (VIE)	DSQ
