= Beach soccer at the 2014 Asian Beach Games =

- Venue: Saphan Hin
- Dates: 15–21 November 2014

Beach soccer competition at the 2014 Asian Beach Games was held in Phuket, Thailand from 15 to 21 November 2014 at Saphan Hin.

== Medalists ==
Event	Gold	Silver	Bronze
Men	Iran; Peyman Hosseini; Amir Hossein Akbari; Hassan Abdollahi; Mehdi Hassani; Ali Naderi; Shahriar Mojdeh; Farid Boloukbashi; Mohammad Ali Mokhtari; Mohammad Ahmadzadeh; Hamid Behzadpour	Japan; Shingo Terukina; Tetsuji Sugita; Hirofumi Oda; Naoya Matsuo; Masahito Toma; Ozu Moreira; Takasuke Goto; Takaaki Oba; Takuya Akaguma; Takashi Takiguchi	United Arab Emirates; Mohamed Al-Jasmi; Abbas Daryaei; Ahmed Beshr Salem; Waleed Beshr Salem; Hasan Al-Hammadi; Ali Mohammadi; Ali Hassan Karim; Walid Mohammadi; Adel Ranjabar; Humaid Al-Balooshi

== Results ==
=== First round ===
==== Group A ====
Pos	Team	Pld	W	WE	WP	L	GF	GA	GD	Pts
1	Thailand	3	3	0	0	0	12	5	+7	9
2	Vietnam	3	2	0	0	1	13	8	+5	6
3	Qatar	3	0	1	0	2	7	11	−4	2
4	Kuwait	3	0	0	0	3	5	13	−8	0

Source: BSWW
15 November
11:00

Vietnam	6–2	Kuwait
Trần Vĩnh Phong 8', 28', 35'; Bùi Trần Tuấn Anh 9', 34'; Mai Bá Cường 18'		Hussain 13'; Yaqoub 21'

Saphan Hin, Phuket
Referee: Turki Al-Salehi (Oman)

15 November
14:45

Qatar	1–5	Thailand
Al-Sharqi 22'		Madtoha 3'; Nanan 24', 25'; Songpiew 27'; Tapinna 29'

Saphan Hin, Phuket
Referee: Ebrahim Akbarpour (Iran)

16 November
12:15

Vietnam	3–1	Qatar
Trần Văn Hòa 5'; Trần Vĩnh Phong 32'; Phùng Ngọc Vĩnh Quý 36'		Al-Buainain 6'

Saphan Hin, Phuket
Referee: Bakhtiyor Namazov (Uzbekistan)

16 November
14:45

Thailand	2–0	Kuwait
Nanan 24', 33' (pen.)

Saphan Hin, Phuket
Referee: Ahmed Al-Salami (United Arab mirates)

17 November
11:00

Kuwait	3–5 (a.e.t.)	Qatar
Yaqoub 10'; Hajeyah 20'; Hussain 36'		Idrees 3'; Al-Sharqi 18', 35'; Al-Kuwari 38', 39'

Saphan Hin, Phuket
Referee: Wan Mohd Tarmizi (Malaysia)

17 November
14:45

Thailand	5–4	Vietnam
Tapinna 2', 25', 29'; Lepaijit 19'; Nanan 33'		Trần Văn Hòa 5'; Mai Bá Cường 17'; Lê Kim Tuấn 20'; Lê Ngọc Phước 30'

Saphan Hin, Phuket
Referee: Ramin Haghighizadeh (Iran)

==== Group B ====
Pos	Team	Pld	W	WE	WP	L	GF	GA	GD	Pts
1	Oman	2	1	1	0	0	11	6	+5	5
2	Iran	2	1	0	0	1	10	8	+2	3
3	Syria	2	0	0	0	2	8	15	−7	0

Source: BSWW
15 November
13:30

Iran	9–3	Syria
Ahmadzadeh 2', 14'; Hosseini 3', 8'; Boloukbashi 11'; Mokhtari 15', 28'; Mojdeh 35'; Akbari 36'		Habeib 12'; Kbaili 18'; Ahmad 27'

Saphan Hin, Phuket
Referee: Ebrahim Al-Mansoori (United Arab Emirates)

16 November
13:30

Oman	6–5	Syria
Al-Farsi 3'; K. Al-Araimi 3', 14'; Y. Al-Alawi 24'; Y. Al-Araimi 26', 36'		Adrah 3'; Chlhoum 6'; Ahmad 21'; Kbaili 34'; Habeib 35'

Saphan Hin, Phuket
Referee: Suhaimi Mat Hassan (Malaysia)

18 November
14:45

Iran	1–5 (a.e.t.)	Oman
Mojdeh 10'		Y. Al-Araimi 30', 38', 39'; Al-Sinani 37'; Y. Al-Alawi 37'

Saphan Hin, Phuket
Referee: Abdulla Qasim Saleh (Bahrain)

==== Group C ====
Pos	Team	Pld	W	WE	WP	L	GF	GA	GD	Pts
1	China	2	1	0	0	1	9	7	+2	3
2	Bahrain	2	1	0	0	1	6	7	−1	3
3	Uzbekistan	2	0	0	1	1	8	9	−1	1

Source: BSWW
15 November
12:15

China	4–2	Uzbekistan
Cai Weiming 22'; Wan Chao 26', 29'; Han Xuegeng 35'		Sharipov 13'; Fakhriddinov 19'

Saphan Hin, Phuket
Referee: Abdulaziz Abdullah (Kuwait)

17 November
13:30

Bahrain	3–4	Uzbekistan
J. Al-Doseri 3'; Al-Abdulla 22'; Al-Mughawi 35'		T. Al-Doseri 25' (o.g.); Abdurazzakov 31', 33'; Sharipov 36'

Saphan Hin, Phuket
Referee: Abdullah Al-Rashdi (Oman)

18 November
13:30

China	5–5 (a.e.t.)	Bahrain
Han Xuegeng 6'; Wen Tingyuan 7', 9'; Liu Yisi 21', 26'		Ashoor 16'; I. Al-Doseri 20', 33'; J. Al-Doseri 33'; Al-Mughawi 36'
Penalties
Wan Chao (penalty scored); Han Xuegeng (penalty scored); Liu Yisi (penalty missed)	2–3	(penalty scored) Al-Mughawi; (penalty scored) Al-Ghawi; (penalty scored) J. Al-Doseri

Saphan Hin, Phuket
Referee: Ebrahim Al-Mansoori (United Arab Emirates)

==== Group D ====
Pos	Team	Pld	W	WE	WP	L	GF	GA	GD	Pts
1	United Arab Emirates	2	1	0	1	0	6	2	+4	4
2	Japan	2	1	0	0	1	5	2	+3	3
3	Malaysia	2	0	0	0	2	4	11	−7	0

Source: BSWW
16 November
11:00

Japan	5–2	Malaysia
Oda 5'; Akaguma 20', 26'; Ozu 31'; Goto 34' (pen.)		Nor 4'; Mohamad 13'

Saphan Hin, Phuket
Referee: Suwat Wongsuwan (Thailand)

17 November
12:15

United Arab Emirates	6–2	Malaysia
Al-Hammadi 1'; A. Salem 3', 32' (pen.); Karim 10', 11'; Ranjabar 22'		Norwawi 13'; Yusof 14' (pen.)

Saphan Hin, Phuket
Referee: Hassan Abed Rabbo (Lebanon)

18 November
12:15

Japan	0–0 (a.e.t.)	United Arab Emirates
Penalties
Ozu (penalty missed); Akaguma (penalty missed)	0–2	(penalty scored) Al-Hammadi; (penalty scored) Daryaei

Saphan Hin, Phuket
Referee: Liang Shao (China)

=== Final round ===
Quarterfinals
19 November
Oman	3 (4)
Vietnam (p)	3 (5)
19 November
China	3
Japan	7
19 November
Thailand	1
Iran	3
19 November
United Arab Emirates	6
Uzbekistan	4

Semifinals
20 November
Vietnam	2
Japan	7
20 November
Iran (p)	4 (3)
United Arab Emirates	4 (1)

Gold medal match
21 November
Japan	3
Iran	4
Bronze medal match
21 November
Vietnam	2
United Arab Emirates	8

Classification 5–8
20 November
Oman (p)	4 (3)
China	4 (2)
20 November
Thailand	3
Uzbekistan	5

5th–6th place match
21 November
Oman	8
Uzbekistan	2
7th–8th place match
21 November
China	2
Thailand	3

==== Quarterfinals ====
19 November
11:00

United Arab Emirates	6–4	Uzbekistan
A. Salem 1', 11'; Al-Hammadi 4'; Karim 6'; Al-Jasmi 12'; Ranjabar 13'		Sharipov 3', 31', 33' (pen.); Abdurazzakov 19'

Saphan Hin, Phuket
Referee: Abdulaziz Abdullah (Kuwait)

19 November
12:15

China	3–7	Japan
Wen Tingyuan 2'; Chen Xiaowei 20'; Cai Weiming 25'		Akaguma 5', 32'; Oba 16'; Goto 19'; Ozu 30'; Oda 35'; Matsuo 36'

Saphan Hin, Phuket
Referee: Bakhtiyor Namazov (Uzbekistan)

19 November
13:30

Oman	3–3 (a.e.t.)	Vietnam
Y. Al-Alawi 8'; G. Al-Alawi 23'; K. Al-Araimi 26'		Trần Văn Hòa 2'; Bùi Trần Tuấn Anh 24', 28'
Penalties
M. Al-Araimi (penalty scored); Al-Sauti (penalty missed); Y. Al-Alawi (penalty scored); Al-Farsi (penalty scored); Y. Al-Araimi (penalty scored); G. Al-Alawi (penalty missed)	4–5	(penalty scored) Lê Kim Tuấn; (penalty scored) Bùi Trần Tuấn Anh; (penalty missed) Trần Văn Hòa; (penalty scored) Huỳnh Ngọc Cường; (penalty scored) Phùng Ngọc Vĩnh Quý; (penalty scored) Trần Vĩnh Phong

Saphan Hin, Phuket
Referee: Abdulla Qasim Saleh (Bahrain)

19 November
14:45

Thailand	1–3	Iran
Songpiew 22'		Akbari 4', 34'; Abdollahi 7'

Saphan Hin, Phuket
Referee: Liang Shao (China)

==== Classification 5–8 ====
20 November
11:00

Oman	4–4 (a.e.t.)	China
Al-Sinani 20', 21', 23'; Al-Sauti 28'		M. Al-Araimi 25' (o.g.); Chen Xiaowei 34'; Liu Yisi 35', 36'
Penalties
M. Al-Araimi (penalty scored); Y. Al-Alawi (penalty scored); Y. Al-Araimi (penalty scored)	3–2	(penalty scored) Han Xuegeng; (penalty missed) Liu Yisi; (penalty scored) Qiu Hao

Saphan Hin, Phuket
Referee: Wan Mohd Tarmizi (Malaysia)

20 November
12:15

Thailand	3–5	Uzbekistan
Nanan 6'; Tapinna 11', 17'		Abdurazzakov 8'; Fakhriddinov 10'; Sharipov 20', 24'; Sharapov 33'

Saphan Hin, Phuket
Referee: Abdullah Al-Rashdi (Oman)

==== Semifinals ====
20 November
13:30

Vietnam	2–7	Japan
Trần Vĩnh Phong 12'; Bùi Trần Tuấn Anh 24'		Ozu 7', 27'; Akaguma 21'; Toma 24'; Oba 26'; Goto 31', 34'

Saphan Hin, Phuket
Referee: Suhaimi Mat Hassan (Malaysia)

20 November
14:45

Iran	4–4 (a.e.t.)	United Arab Emirates
Ahmadzadeh 2'; Naderi 10', 22'; Boloukbashi 24'		W. Mohammadi 13', 28'; Al-Balooshi 24'; Karim 32'
Penalties
Naderi (penalty scored); Ahmadzadeh (penalty scored); Boloukbashi (penalty scored)	3–1	(penalty scored) Daryaei; (penalty missed) Al-Hammadi

Saphan Hin, Phuket
Referee: Bakhtiyor Namazov (Uzbekistan)

==== 7th–8th place match ====
21 November
11:00

China	2–3	Thailand
Chen Xiaowei 30'; Qiu Hao 35'		Tapinna 3', 8'; Khongkaew 7'

Saphan Hin, Phuket
Referee: Turki Al-Salehi (Oman)

==== 5th–6th place match ====
21 November
12:15

Oman	8–2	Uzbekistan
Al-Balushi 7', 23', 31'; Y. Al-Araimi 11'; K. Al-Araimi 18', 36'; Al-Sauti 34'; Y. Al-Alawi 36'		Mirakhmedov 3', 10'

Saphan Hin, Phuket
Referee: Ebrahim Akbarpour (Iran)

==== Bronze medal match ====
21 November
13:30

Vietnam	2–8	United Arab Emirates
Bùi Trần Tuấn Anh 19', 27'		A. Salem 2', 13', 32'; W. Salem 4', 34'; Al-Hammadi 9'; Al-Balooshi 25'; A. Mohammadi 28'

Saphan Hin, Phuket
Referee: Hassan Abed Rabbo (Lebanon)

==== Gold medal match ====
21 November
14:45

Japan	3–4	Iran
Ozu 10', 25'; Goto 17'		Mojdeh 6'; Naderi 8'; Akbari 28'; Abdollahi 33'

Saphan Hin, Phuket
Referee: Suhaimi Mat Hassan (Malaysia)

== Goalscorers ==
8 goals

- Vitoon Tapinna (THA)

7 goals

- Ahmed Beshr Salem (UAE)
- Jamoliddin Sharipov (UZB)
- Bùi Trần Tuấn Anh (VIE)

6 goals

- Ozu Moreira (JPN)
- Yahya Al-Araimi (OMA)
- Komkrit Nanan (THA)

5 goals

- Takuya Akaguma (JPN)
- Takasuke Goto (JPN)
- Khalid Al-Araimi (OMA)
- Trần Vĩnh Phong (VIE)

4 goals

- Liu Yisi (CHN)
- Amir Hossein Akbari (IRI)
- Yaqoob Al-Alawi (OMA)
- Jalal Al-Sinani (OMA)
- Ali Hassan Karim (UAE)
- Tokhir Abdurazzakov (UZB)

3 goals

- Chen Xiaowei (CHN)
- Wen Tingyuan (CHN)
- Mohammad Ahmadzadeh (IRI)
- Shahriar Mojdeh (IRI)
- Ali Naderi (IRI)
- Abdullah Al-Balushi (OMA)
- Hamad Al-Sharqi (QAT)
- Hasan Al-Hammadi (UAE)
- Trần Văn Hòa (VIE)

2 goals

- Isa Al-Doseri (BRN)
- Jasim Al-Doseri (BRN)
- Ebrahim Al-Mughawi (BRN)
- Cai Weiming (CHN)
- Han Xuegeng (CHN)
- Wan Chao (CHN)
- Hassan Abdollahi (IRI)
- Farid Boloukbashi (IRI)
- Peyman Hosseini (IRI)
- Mohammad Ali Mokhtari (IRI)
- Takaaki Oba (JPN)
- Hirofumi Oda (JPN)
- Mohammad Hussain (KUW)
- Abdulrahman Yaqoub (KUW)
- Abdullah Al-Sauti (OMA)
- Jafal Al-Kuwari (QAT)
- Mohammad Cheikh Ahmad (SYR)
- Hassaan Habeib (SYR)
- Hussam Kbaili (SYR)
- Piyapong Songpiew (THA)
- Humaid Al-Balooshi (UAE)
- Walid Mohammadi (UAE)
- Adel Ranjabar (UAE)
- Waleed Beshr Salem (UAE)
- Feruz Fakhriddinov (UZB)
- Farkhod Mirakhmedov (UZB)
- Mai Bá Cường (VIE)

1 goal

- Abdulla Al-Abdulla (BRN)
- Mohamed Ashoor (BRN)
- Qiu Hao (CHN)
- Naoya Matsuo (JPN)
- Masahito Toma (JPN)
- Mohammad Hajeyah (KUW)
- Fakhrullah Mohamad (MAS)
- Riduwan Mohd Nor (MAS)
- Khairul Azizi Norwawi (MAS)
- Zaharim Yusof (MAS)
- Ghaith Al-Alawi (OMA)
- Said Al-Farsi (OMA)
- Abdulla Al-Buainain (QAT)
- Mohamed Hashim Idrees (QAT)
- Mohammad Adrah (SYR)
- Mged Chlhoum (SYR)
- Pongsak Khongkaew (THA)
- Watchara Lepaijit (THA)
- Manus Madtoha (THA)
- Mohamed Al-Jasmi (UAE)
- Ali Mohammadi (UAE)
- Arslon Sharapov (UZB)
- Lê Kim Tuấn (VIE)
- Lê Ngọc Phước (VIE)
- Phùng Ngọc Vĩnh Quý (VIE)

1 own goal

- Thani Al-Doseri (BRN) (against UZB)
- Mundhar Al-Araimi (OMA) (against CHN)
