= Indonesia at the 2014 Asian Beach Games =

- IOC code: INA
- NOC: Indonesian Olympic Committee
- Website: www.nocindonesia.or.id (in English)

in Phuket
- Competitors: 104 in 16 sports
- Medals Ranked 7th: Gold 7 Silver 7 Bronze 14 Total 28

Asian Beach Games appearances
- 2008; 2010; 2012; 2014; 2016; 2026

Indonesia participated in the 2014 Asian Beach Games in Phuket, Thailand from 14 to 23 November 2014.

== Medal summary ==
=== Medal by sport ===
Medals by sport
Sport	1st place, gold medalist(s)	2nd place, silver medalist(s)	3rd place, bronze medalist(s)	Total
Air sports	1	2	1	4
Beach athletics	1	1	1	3
Beach sepak takraw	0	1	1	2
Beach volleyball	1	0	1	2
Beach woodball	1	0	2	3
Beach wrestling	0	0	1	1
Jet ski	2	1	2	5
Ju-Jitsu	0	0	1	1
Sport climbing	1	1	2	4
Water skiing	0	1	2	3
Total	7	7	14	28

=== Medal by Date ===
Medals by date
Day	Date	1st place, gold medalist(s)	2nd place, silver medalist(s)	3rd place, bronze medalist(s)	Total
–1	12 Nov	0	0	0	0
0	13 Nov	0	0	1	1
1	14 Nov	1	0	2	3
2	15 Nov	1	0	2	3
3	16 Nov	0	1	1	2
4	17 Nov	1	1	0	2
5	18 Nov	0	0	1	1
6	19 Nov	1	0	1	2
7	20 Nov	1	1	1	3
8	21 Nov	1	3	1	5
9	22 Nov	0	0	3	3
10	23 Nov	1	1	1	3
Total		7	7	14	28

=== Medalists ===
Medal	Name	Sport	Event	Date
Gold	Dwi Tiga Putri	Beach woodball	Women's fairway single	14 Nov
Gold	Aspar Jaelolo	Sport climbing	Men's Individual speed	15 Nov
Gold	Aqsa Sutan Aswar	Jet ski	Runabout stock	17 Nov
Gold	Aero Sutan Aswar	Jet ski	Runabout endurance open	19 Nov
Gold	Iswandi	Beach athletics	Men's 60 m	20 Nov
Gold	Thomas Widyananto	Air sports	Men's individual accuracy	21 Nov
Gold	Ade Candra Rachmawan; Koko Prasetyo Darkuncoro	Beach volleyball	Men's event	23 Nov
Silver	Ita Triana Purnamasari; Santy Wellyanti; Tita Supita	Sport climbing	Women's team speed relay	16 Nov
Silver	Aero Sutan Aswar	Jet ski	Runabout stock	17 Nov
Silver	Febrianto Kadir	Water skiing	Men's tricks	20 Nov
Silver	Ardi Kurniawan; Darumaka Rajasa; Dede Supratman; Joni Efendi; Thomas Widyananto	Air sports	Men's team accuracy	21 Nov
Silver	Ifa Kurniawati; Ike Ayu Wulandari; Lis Andriana; Nofricayanti; Rika Wijayanti	Air sports	Women's team accuracy	21 Nov
Silver	Lismawati Illang; Aprilia Kartina; Triyani Pamungkas	Beach athletics	Women's Cross-country team	21 Nov
Silver	Nofrizal; Syamsul Akmal; Hendra Pago; Muhammad Ruswan Wajib; Victoria Eka Prasetyo; Firmansyah	Beach sepak takraw	Men's regu	23 Nov
Bronze	Lia Nurlianty Sofyan; Eko Hendrawan	Ju-jitsu	Duo mixed	13 Nov
Bronze	Ahris Sumariyanto	Beach woodball	Men's fairway single	14 Nov
Bronze	Marga Nugraha Susilo	Beach woodball	Men's fairway single	14 Nov
Bronze	Heka Masa Sembiring	Beach wrestling	Women's freestyle -50 kg	15 Nov
Bronze	Tita Supita	Sport climbing	Women's individual speed	15 Nov
Bronze	Aspar Jaelolo; Fajri Ashari; Nanang Ibrahim	Sport climbing	Men's team speed relay	16 Nov
Bronze	Aero Sutan Aswar	Jet ski	Runabout open	18 Nov
Bronze	Aqsa Sutan Aswar	Jet ski	Runabout endurance open	19 Nov
Bronze	Ummu Thoyibhatus Sholikah	Water skiing	Women's slalom	20 Nov
Bronze	Lis Andriana	Air sports	Women's individual accuracy	21 Nov
Bronze	Indra Hardinata; Febrianto Kadir; Dimas Ridho Suprihono; Galuh Mutiara Maulidina; Nur Alimah Priambodo; Ummu Thoyibhatus Sholikah	Water skiing	Ski team overall	22 Nov
Bronze	Triyani Pamungkas; Aprilia Kartina; Lismawati Illang; Serafi Anelies Unani	Beach athletics	Women's 4x60m relay	22 Nov
Bronze	Dini Mita Sari; Akyko Micheel Kapito; Widya Andrini Modjundju; Nur Isni Chikita Sumito; Kusnelia; Irma Wati	Beach sepak takraw	Women's regu	22 Nov
Bronze	Dhita Juliana; Putu Dini Jasita Utami	Beach volleyball	Women's event	23 Nov

Last updated 23 November 2014
