= Air sports at the 2014 Asian Beach Games =

- Venue: Chaofa Mine
- Dates: 15–21 November 2014

Air sports competition at the 2014 Asian Beach Games was held in Phuket, Thailand from 15 to 21 November 2014 at Chaofa Mine. The competition consisted of paragliding (accuracy competition) and paramotoring.

== Medalists ==
=== Paragliding accuracy ===
Event	Gold	Silver	Bronze
Men's individual	Thomas Widyananto; Indonesia	Won Yong-mook; South Korea	Ha Chi-kyong; South Korea
Men's team	South Korea; Ha Chi-kyong; Kim Ki-hyeon; Lee Chul-soo; Phi Soo-yong; Won Yong-mook	Indonesia; Joni Efendi; Ardi Kurniawan; Darumaka Rajasa; Dede Supratman; Thomas Widyananto	Japan; Takeshi Furuta; Makoto Kawamura; Masaki Komatsu; Yoshiki Oka
Women's individual	Chantika Chaisanuk; Thailand	Jutamas Yangjui; Thailand	Lis Andriana; Indonesia
Women's team	Thailand; Chantika Chaisanuk; Surattana Chuaykaew; Nunnapat Phuchong; Narubhorn Wathaya; Jutamas Yangjui	Indonesia; Lis Andriana; Ifa Kurniawati; Rika Wijayanti; Ike Ayu Wulandari; Nofrica Yanti	South Korea; Baek Jin-hee; Jung Mi-ae; Kang In-suk; Lee Da-gyeom; Shin Jae-myeong

=== Paramotoring ===
Event	Gold	Silver	Bronze
Individual economy	Kittiphop Phrommat; Thailand	Jiri George Macak; Thailand	Abdullatif Al-Qahtani; Qatar
Individual precision	Kittiphop Phrommat; Thailand	Chayaphong Pothipuk; Thailand	Mohammed Al-Yafei; Qatar
Individual combined	Kittiphop Phrommat; Thailand	Pongkorn Thanasakunkornsang; Thailand	Mohammed Al-Yafei; Qatar
Team combined	Thailand; Awatsada Chaiyasorn; Pattarin Insornsart; Aroonrat Jongonklang; Jiri George Macak; Kroekrit Muenphukhiao; Tanaporn Panapho; Kittiphop Phrommat; Chayaphong Pothipuk; Chanapa Sermsai; Pongkorn Thanasakunkornsang	Qatar; Abdulaziz Al-Emadi; Saeed Al-Naimi; Abdullatif Al-Qahtani; Ali Al-Yafei; Mohammed Al-Yafei	China; Cai He; Gu Yanpeng; Li Liang; Nie Yunan

== Medal table ==
Rank	Nation	Gold	Silver	Bronze	Total
1	Thailand (THA)	6	4	0	10
2	Indonesia (INA)	1	2	1	4
3	South Korea (KOR)	1	1	2	4
4	Qatar (QAT)	0	1	3	4
5	China (CHN)	0	0	1	1
5	Japan (JPN)	0	0	1	1
Totals (6 entries)		8	8	8	24

== Results ==
=== Paragliding accuracy ===
==== Men's individual ====
15–21 November

Rank	Athlete	Score
1st place, gold medalist(s)	Thomas Widyananto (INA)	20
2nd place, silver medalist(s)	Won Yong-mook (KOR)	22
3rd place, bronze medalist(s)	Ha Chi-kyong (KOR)	33
4	Joni Efendi (INA)	39
4	Phi Soo-yong (KOR)	39
6	Makoto Kawamura (JPN)	58
7	Kim Ki-hyeon (KOR)	75
8	Ke Kangfei (CHN)	144
9	Wang Jianwei (CHN)	184
10	Yoshiki Oka (JPN)	196
11	Nithat Yangjui (THA)	211
12	Ma Qiang (CHN)	306
13	Mongkut Preecha (THA)	325
14	Ardi Kurniawan (INA)	344
15	Dede Supratman (INA)	357
16	Jirasak Witeetham (THA)	378
17	Mohd Nafi Sulaiman (MAS)	435
18	Darumaka Rajasa (INA)	492
19	Tanapat Luangiam (THA)	578
20	Faridil Fadzreen (MAS)	612
21	Masaki Komatsu (JPN)	867
22	Suhari Jainau (MAS)	1044
23	Takeshi Furuta (JPN)	1060
24	Faizal Abdul Wahab (MAS)	1258
25	Lee Chul-soo (KOR)	1306
26	Zhu Zhifeng (CHN)	1332
27	Saran Changsieng (THA)	1366
28	Wu Jianjian (CHN)	1563
29	Phùng Đức Thắng (VIE)	2143
30	Nurhaqimy Ismail (MAS)	2649
31	Võ Quốc Thắng (VIE)	2745
32	Ali Al-Hosani (UAE)	3153
33	Bùi Trọng Hiếu (VIE)	5226

==== Men's team ====
15–21 November

Rank	Team	Score
1st place, gold medalist(s)	South Korea (KOR)	129
2nd place, silver medalist(s)	Indonesia (INA)	710
3rd place, bronze medalist(s)	Japan (JPN)	735
4	China (CHN)	921
5	Thailand (THA)	963
6	Malaysia (MAS)	2226
7	Vietnam (VIE)	13114
8	United Arab Emirates (UAE)	20153

==== Women's individual ====
15–21 November

Rank	Athlete	Score
1st place, gold medalist(s)	Chantika Chaisanuk (THA)	83
2nd place, silver medalist(s)	Jutamas Yangjui (THA)	274
3	Narubhorn Wathaya (THA)	364
3rd place, bronze medalist(s)	Lis Andriana (INA)	388
5	Norhayati Jamaludin (MAS)	545
6	Nunnapat Phuchong (THA)	583
7	Rika Wijayanti (INA)	584
8	Ifa Kurniawati (INA)	606
9	Baek Jin-hee (KOR)	636
10	Kang In-suk (KOR)	816
11	Ike Ayu Wulandari (INA)	833
12	Lee Da-gyeom (KOR)	875
13	Nofrica Yanti (INA)	959
14	Surattana Chuaykaew (THA)	1776
15	Jung Mi-ae (KOR)	3009
16	Zhang Ling (CHN)	3166
17	Shak Yee Ling (MAS)	3789
18	Shin Jae-myeong (KOR)	3792
19	Asjanita Aini (MAS)	3813
20	Normahanim Mohd Nor (MAS)	6147

- Lis Andriana was awarded bronze because of no three-medal sweep per country rule.

==== Women's team ====
15–21 November

Rank	Team	Score
1st place, gold medalist(s)	Thailand (THA)	466
2nd place, silver medalist(s)	Indonesia (INA)	1547
3rd place, bronze medalist(s)	South Korea (KOR)	3700
4	Malaysia (MAS)	10072
5	China (CHN)	20166

=== Paramotoring ===
==== Individual economy ====
16–20 November

Rank	Athlete	Score
1st place, gold medalist(s)	Kittiphop Phrommat (THA)	80
2nd place, silver medalist(s)	Jiri George Macak (THA)	68
3	Pongkorn Thanasakunkornsang (THA)	61
3rd place, bronze medalist(s)	Abdullatif Al-Qahtani (QAT)	60
5	Nie Yunan (CHN)	50
6	Mohammed Al-Yafei (QAT)	46
7	Saeed Al-Naimi (QAT)	45
8	Aroonrat Jongonklang (THA)	41
9	Ali Al-Yafei (QAT)	40
10	Kroekrit Muenphukhiao (THA)	33
11	Tanaporn Panapho (THA)	33
12	Pattarin Insornsart (THA)	33
13	Mohamed Al-Falasi (UAE)	32
14	Zayed Al-Mansoori (UAE)	31
15	Li Liang (CHN)	23
16	Ahmad Al-Mas (KUW)	22
17	Na Ki-il (KOR)	22
18	Mohd Farid Abd Rahman (MAS)	21
19	Ng Chong Heok (MAS)	21
20	Randell Raymundo (PHI)	18
21	Chanapa Sermsai (THA)	16
22	Cai He (CHN)	15
23	An Sueng-yong (KOR)	15
24	Easa Al-Qallaf (KUW)	12
25	Saeed Al-Naqbi (UAE)	12
26	Awatsada Chaiyasorn (THA)	12
27	Kim Ho-sung (KOR)	10
28	Abdulaziz Al-Emadi (QAT)	10
29	Gu Yanpeng (CHN)	9
30	Husain Al-Hammadi (UAE)	9
31	Chayaphong Pothipuk (THA)	8
32	Soon Hoe Chuan (MAS)	6
33	Ho Thiam Sing (MAS)	6
34	Helal Al-Mansoori (UAE)	6
35	Taleb Al-Atar (KUW)	4
36	Kim Nam-yong (KOR)	2
37	Nayef Beijaan (KUW)	0
37	Zul Majdi Saari (MAS)	0
37	Ibrahim Al-Rushoud (KUW)	0

- Abdullatif Al-Qahtani was awarded bronze because of no three-medal sweep per country rule.

==== Individual precision ====
15–20 November

Rank	Athlete	Score
1st place, gold medalist(s)	Kittiphop Phrommat (THA)	173
2nd place, silver medalist(s)	Chayaphong Pothipuk (THA)	172
3	Pongkorn Thanasakunkornsang (THA)	160
3rd place, bronze medalist(s)	Mohammed Al-Yafei (QAT)	153
5	Kroekrit Muenphukhiao (THA)	140
6	Jiri George Macak (THA)	135
7	Gu Yanpeng (CHN)	123
8	Cai He (CHN)	118
9	Li Liang (CHN)	115
10	Saeed Al-Naimi (QAT)	111
11	Soon Hoe Chuan (MAS)	108
12	Zayed Al-Mansoori (UAE)	105
13	Kim Nam-yong (KOR)	104
14	Aroonrat Jongonklang (THA)	95
15	Nie Yunan (CHN)	94
16	Helal Al-Mansoori (UAE)	94
17	Awatsada Chaiyasorn (THA)	92
18	Na Ki-il (KOR)	88
19	Ali Al-Yafei (QAT)	87
20	Ng Chong Heok (MAS)	84
21	An Sueng-yong (KOR)	83
22	Saeed Al-Naqbi (UAE)	81
23	Ho Thiam Sing (MAS)	80
24	Kim Ho-sung (KOR)	76
25	Husain Al-Hammadi (UAE)	75
26	Abdullatif Al-Qahtani (QAT)	73
27	Randell Raymundo (PHI)	71
28	Mohd Farid Abd Rahman (MAS)	71
29	Pattarin Insornsart (THA)	69
30	Taleb Al-Atar (KUW)	69
31	Ahmad Al-Mas (KUW)	67
32	Abdulaziz Al-Emadi (QAT)	60
33	Mohamed Al-Falasi (UAE)	59
34	Chanapa Sermsai (THA)	52
35	Tanaporn Panapho (THA)	51
36	Easa Al-Qallaf (KUW)	49
37	Ibrahim Al-Rushoud (KUW)	45
38	Zul Majdi Saari (MAS)	27
39	Nayef Beijaan (KUW)	20

- Mohammed Al-Yafei was awarded bronze because of no three-medal sweep per country rule.

==== Individual combined ====
15–20 November

Rank	Athlete	Score
1st place, gold medalist(s)	Kittiphop Phrommat (THA)	253
2nd place, silver medalist(s)	Pongkorn Thanasakunkornsang (THA)	221
3	Jiri George Macak (THA)	203
3rd place, bronze medalist(s)	Mohammed Al-Yafei (QAT)	199
5	Chayaphong Pothipuk (THA)	180
6	Kroekrit Muenphukhiao (THA)	173
7	Saeed Al-Naimi (QAT)	156
8	Nie Yunan (CHN)	144
9	Li Liang (CHN)	138
10	Aroonrat Jongonklang (THA)	136
11	Zayed Al-Mansoori (UAE)	136
12	Abdullatif Al-Qahtani (QAT)	133
13	Cai He (CHN)	133
14	Gu Yanpeng (CHN)	132
15	Ali Al-Yafei (QAT)	127
16	Soon Hoe Chuan (MAS)	114
17	Na Ki-il (KOR)	110
18	Kim Nam-yong (KOR)	106
19	Ng Chong Heok (MAS)	105
20	Awatsada Chaiyasorn (THA)	104
21	Pattarin Insornsart (THA)	102
22	Helal Al-Mansoori (UAE)	100
23	An Sueng-yong (KOR)	98
24	Saeed Al-Naqbi (UAE)	93
25	Mohd Farid Abd Rahman (MAS)	92
26	Mohamed Al-Falasi (UAE)	91
27	Ahmad Al-Mas (KUW)	89
28	Randell Raymundo (PHI)	89
29	Kim Ho-sung (KOR)	86
30	Ho Thiam Sing (MAS)	86
31	Husain Al-Hammadi (UAE)	84
32	Tanaporn Panapho (THA)	84
33	Taleb Al-Atar (KUW)	73
34	Abdulaziz Al-Emadi (QAT)	70
35	Chanapa Sermsai (THA)	68
36	Easa Al-Qallaf (KUW)	61
37	Ibrahim Al-Rushoud (KUW)	45
38	Zul Majdi Saari (MAS)	27
39	Nayef Beijaan (KUW)	20

- Mohammed Al-Yafei was awarded bronze because of no three-medal sweep per country rule.

==== Team combined ====
15–20 November

Rank	Team	Score
1st place, gold medalist(s)	Thailand (THA)	749
2nd place, silver medalist(s)	Qatar (QAT)	510
3rd place, bronze medalist(s)	China (CHN)	459
4	United Arab Emirates (UAE)	387
5	South Korea (KOR)	354
6	Malaysia (MAS)	322
7	Kuwait (KUW)	245
8	Philippines (PHI)	89
