= Athletics at the 2015 SEA Games – Men's 200 metres =

Athletics – Men's 200 metres at the 2015 SEA Games
- Venue: Nation stadium
- Date: 10 June 2015
- Competitors: 12 from 7 nations

Medalists
gold medal	Lê Trọng Hinh	Vietnam
silver medal	Jaran Sathoengram	Thailand
bronze medal	Jirapong Meenapra	Thailand

Video on YouTube Official Video

The men's 200 metres competition of the athletics event at the 2015 SEA Games was held on 10 June at the National Stadium in Singapore.

== Records ==
Prior to this competition, the existing Asian and Games records were as follows:

Asian record	Shingo Suetsugu (JPN)	20.03	Yokohama, Japan	7 June 2003
Games record	Reanchai Seeharwong (THA)	20.69	Bandar Seri Begawan, Brunei	10 August 1999

== Schedule ==
All times are Singapore Standard Time (UTC+08:00)

Date	Time	Event
Saturday, 10 June 2015	9:40	Heat 1
Saturday, 10 June 2015	9:50	Heat 2
Saturday, 10 June 2015	18:45	Final

== Results ==
=== Round 1 ===
Source: Results Summary

- Qualification: First 3 in each heat (Q) and the next 2 fastest (q) advance to the final.

==== Heat 1 ====
Source: Results Heat 1

- Wind: +0.2 m/s

Rank	Athlete	Time	Notes
1	Le Trong Hinh (VIE)	21.14	Q, PB
2	Jirapong Meenapra (THA)	21.24	Q, PB
3	Fadlin Fadlin (INA)	21.36	Q
4	Mohd Izzudin Yahaya (MAS)	21.45	q
5	Saiyfon Luangsulin (LAO)	22.91	
6	Muhammad Elfi Mustapa (SIN)	DNF	

==== Heat 2 ====
Source: Results Heat 2

- Wind: -0.1 m/s

Rank	Athlete	Time	Notes
1	Aravinn Thevarr Gunasegaran (MAS)	21.25	Q, PB
2	Jaran Sathoengram (THA)	21.38	Q
3	Lee Cheng Wei (SIN)	21.59	Q, SB
4	Sapwaturrahman Sapwaturrahman (INA)	21.60	q
5	Phearath Nget (CAM)	21.91	PB
6	Aksonesath Rajvong (LAO)	23.08	

=== Final ===
Source: Result Final

- Wind: -0.1 m/s

Rank	Athlete	Time	Notes
1st place, gold medalist(s)	Le Trong Hinh (VIE)	20.89	PB
2nd place, silver medalist(s)	Jaran Sathoengram (THA)	21.05	PB
3rd place, bronze medalist(s)	Jirapong Meenapra (THA)	21.13	PB
4	Mohd Izzudin Yahaya (MAS)	21.20	SB
5	Aravinn Thevarr Gunasegaran (MAS)	21.33	
6	Fadlin Fadlin (INA)	21.47	
7	Lee Cheng Wei (SIN)	21.63	
8	Sapwaturrahman Sapwaturrahman (INA)	21.74	

== See also ==
- Official website
