= Cambodia at the 2015 World Championships in Athletics =

- WA code: CAM

in Beijing
- Competitors: 1
- Medals: Gold 0 Silver 0 Bronze 0 Total 0

World Championships in Athletics appearances
- 1983; 1987–1995; 1997; 1999; 2001–2003; 2005; 2007; 2009; 2011; 2013; 2015; 2017; 2019; 2022–2023; 2025

Cambodia competed at the 2015 World Championships in Athletics in Beijing, China, from 22–30 August 2015.

== Results ==
(q – qualified, NM – no mark, SB – season best)

=== Men ===
Track and road events

Athlete	Event	Heat		Semifinal		Final	
Athlete	Event	Result	Rank	Result	Rank	Result	Rank
Phearath Nget	200 metres	22.11	7	Did not advance			
