= Thailand at the 2014 Asian Beach Games =

- IOC code: THA
- NOC: National Olympic Committee of Thailand
- Website: www.olympicthai.or.th/eng (in English and Thai)

in Phuket
- Competitors: 367 (232 men & 135 women) in 28 sports
- Medals Ranked 1st: Gold 56 Silver 37 Bronze 33 Total 126

Asian Beach Games appearances
- 2008; 2010; 2012; 2014; 2016; 2026

Thailand was the host nation for the 2014 Asian Beach Games held in Phuket from 14 to 23 November 2014.

== Competitors ==
Sport	Men	Women	Total
Air Sports	10	10	20
Beach Athletics	17	13	30
Beach Basketball	4	4	8
Beach Flag Football	10	0	10
Beach Handball	17	11	26
Beach Modern Pentathlon	2	2	4
Beach Sepaktakraw	19	12	31
Beach Soccer	15	0	15
Beach Volleyball	4	4	8
Beach Water Polo	11	0	11
Beach Wrestling	3	3	6
Extreme Sports	14	0	14
Foot Volley	3	0	3
Jetski	10	0	10
Ju-Jitsu	11	6	17
Kurash	2	3	5
Marathon Swimming	3	4	7
Muaythai	6	5	11
Petanque	9	9	18
Sailing / Windsurfing	11	9	20
Sambo	3	3	6
Sport Climbing	5	4	9
Squash	1	1	2
Triathlon	8	7	15
WaterSki	8	8	16
Beach Woodball	10	10	20
Total	214	128	342

== Medal summary ==
=== Medal by sport ===
Medals by sport
Sport	1st place, gold medalist(s)	2nd place, silver medalist(s)	3rd place, bronze medalist(s)	Total
Air Sports	6	4	0	10
Beach Athletics	4	1	3	8
Beach Basketball	0	0	2	2
Beach Flag Football	1	0	0	1
Beach Handball	1	0	0	1
Beach Kabaddi	0	1	0	1
Beach Sepaktakraw	4	0	0	4
Beach Volleyball	0	1	0	1
Beach Woodball	6	5	0	11
Beach Wrestling	0	1	3	4
Bodybuilding	0	2	1	3
Extreme Sports	6	6	4	16
Foot Volley	1	0	0	1
Jetski	4	2	2	8
Ju-Jitsu	2	2	5	9
Kurash	1	1	2	4
Marathon Swimming	0	1	0	1
Muaythai	9	1	1	11
Petanque	5	1	3	9
Sailing / Windsurfing	3	4	3	10
Sambo	0	0	1	1
Sport Climbing	0	1	0	1
WaterSki	3	3	3	9
Total	56	37	33	126

=== Medal by Date ===
Medals by date
Day	Date	1st place, gold medalist(s)	2nd place, silver medalist(s)	3rd place, bronze medalist(s)	Total
–1	12 Nov	0	1	4	5
0	13 Nov	2	1	2	5
1	14 Nov	2	2	0	4
2	15 Nov	1	2	3	6
3	16 Nov	4	5	3	12
4	17 Nov	4	1	5	10
5	18 Nov	12	3	3	18
6	19 Nov	4	5	2	11
7	20 Nov	6	7	8	21
8	21 Nov	6	4	2	12
9	22 Nov	13	4	1	18
10	23 Nov	2	2	0	4
Total		56	37	33	126
