= Bodybuilding at the 2014 Asian Beach Games =

- Venue: Karon Beach
- Dates: 21–22 November 2014

Classic bodybuilding competition at the 2014 Asian Beach Games was held in Phuket, Thailand from 21 to 22 November 2014 at Karon Beach, Phuket. There were six events in original program but 176 cm and +176 cm were merged due to lack of entries.

== Medalists ==
Event	Gold	Silver	Bronze
162 cm	Ali Abdulrasool; Bahrain	Phanorn Onnim; Thailand	Takahiro Mizoguchi; Japan
165 cm	Nguyễn Hải Âu; Vietnam	Sirigorn Khodkit; Thailand	Zhao Tangmin; China
168 cm	Sê Pha; Vietnam	Rouhollah Mirnourollahi; Iran	Seol Ki-kwan; South Korea
172 cm	Javad Soltani; Iran	Trần Hữu Thuận; Vietnam	Yang Yeon-seok; South Korea
+172 cm	Chen Kang; China	Ryu Je-hyung; South Korea	Worakorn Wongsakornmuaeng; Thailand

== Medal table ==
Rank	Nation	Gold	Silver	Bronze	Total
1	Vietnam (VIE)	2	1	0	3
2	Iran (IRI)	1	1	0	2
3	China (CHN)	1	0	1	2
4	Bahrain (BRN)	1	0	0	1
5	Thailand (THA)	0	2	1	3
6	South Korea (KOR)	0	1	2	3
7	Japan (JPN)	0	0	1	1
Totals (7 entries)		5	5	5	15

== Results ==
=== 162 cm ===
21–22 November

Rank	Athlete	Prej.	Final
1st place, gold medalist(s)	Ali Abdulrasool (BRN)	12	19
2nd place, silver medalist(s)	Phanorn Onnim (THA)	9	36
3rd place, bronze medalist(s)	Takahiro Mizoguchi (JPN)	15	44
4	Shaheen Ibrahim Didi (MDV)	22	67
5	Zhu Junqiang (CHN)	23	73
6	Mohamed Moosa (MDV)	26	80
7	Tshering Dorji (BHU)	33	

=== 165 cm ===
21–22 November

Rank	Athlete	Prej.	Final
1st place, gold medalist(s)	Nguyễn Hải Âu (VIE)	5	15
2nd place, silver medalist(s)	Sirigorn Khodkit (THA)	10	30
3rd place, bronze medalist(s)	Zhao Tangmin (CHN)	17	45
4	Tetsuya Hara (JPN)	18	60
5	Husham Hameed (MDV)	25	75

=== 168 cm ===
21–22 November

Rank	Athlete	Prej.	Final
1st place, gold medalist(s)	Sê Pha (VIE)	12	21
2nd place, silver medalist(s)	Rouhollah Mirnourollahi (IRI)	12	25
3rd place, bronze medalist(s)	Seol Ki-kwan (KOR)	14	50
4	Kang Sung-won (KOR)	20	63
5	Parinya Aimoey (THA)	18	68
6	Dang Zhiyong (CHN)	30	90
7	Toshikazu Kataoka (JPN)	35	
8	Mohamed Hasan Seroor (BRN)	40	

=== 172 cm ===
21–22 November

Rank	Athlete	Prej.	Final
1st place, gold medalist(s)	Javad Soltani (IRI)	8	15
2nd place, silver medalist(s)	Trần Hữu Thuận (VIE)	11	30
3rd place, bronze medalist(s)	Yang Yeon-seok (KOR)	10	46
4	Ran Maorong (CHN)	19	55
5	Yaseen Mohamed Moosa (BRN)	25	75

=== +172 cm ===
21–22 November

Rank	Athlete	Prej.	Final
1st place, gold medalist(s)	Chen Kang (CHN)	6	20
2nd place, silver medalist(s)	Ryu Je-hyung (KOR)	9	26
3rd place, bronze medalist(s)	Worakorn Wongsakornmuaeng (THA)	15	48
4	Mohamed Yameen (MDV)	24	67
5	Damrongsak Soisri (THA)	21	67
6	Shahzeb Khan (PAK)	30	90
