= Beach woodball at the 2014 Asian Beach Games =

- Venue: Karon Beach
- Dates: 14–19 November 2014

Beach woodball competition at the 2014 Asian Beach Games was held in Phuket, Thailand from 14 to 19 November 2014 at Karon Beach.

== Medalists ==
=== Stroke ===
| Event | Gold | Silver | Bronze |
|---|---|---|---|
| Men's singles | Klayut Mongkholsamai; Thailand | Wattana Phromkaew; Thailand | Ye Qiwei; China |
| Men's team | Thailand; Chinnakrit Imkrajang; Klayut Mongkholsamai; Nakorn Nualraksa; Wattana Phromkaew; Punnavich Polburi; Weerasak Srisamoot | Chinese Taipei; Ho Sheng-hui; Hsiao Chia-hung; Huang Ming-ting; Hung Chia-tse; Lee Kuei-chang; Lin Hsin-cheng | China; Deng Kezhou; Tan Mingyang; Wang Xinbing; Ye Qiwei; Zhang Feng; Zhou Yi |
| Women's singles | Praewpan Chaithong; Thailand | Pornpimon Buaklang; Thailand | Chiang Fang-yu; Chinese Taipei |
| Women's team | Thailand; Srisuda Bootju; Pornpimon Buaklang; Praewpan Chaithong; Chonnipa Pengwichai; Jenjira Rachaseemuang; Thanchanok Sareepan | Chinese Taipei; Cai Yi-ting; Chiang Fang-yu; Chung Pi-ju; Hong Yu-mei; Jian Man-jun; Wang Chin-tsu | China; Guan Ting; Hao Jingjie; Lan Qiu; Li Yifeng; Wang Ping; Zhu Xiaojing |

=== Fairway ===
| Event | Gold | Silver | Bronze |
|---|---|---|---|
| Men's singles | Peera Chaisongkram; Thailand | Siraphop Wannapin; Thailand | Ahris Sumariyanto; Indonesia |
| Men's singles | Peera Chaisongkram; Thailand | Siraphop Wannapin; Thailand | Marga Nugraha Susilo; Indonesia |
| Men's team | Thailand; Peera Chaisongkram; Sarawuth Intarasiri; Naluenat Puangmaduea; Siraphop Wannapin | Chinese Taipei; Fan Hung-chang; Hsu Guo-zhan; Huang Kai-ho; Lin Yu-hsien | Vietnam; Cao Hoàng Anh; Phạm Công Thành; Trần Duy Anh; Trần Quang Dũng |
| Men's team | Thailand; Peera Chaisongkram; Sarawuth Intarasiri; Naluenat Puangmaduea; Siraphop Wannapin | Chinese Taipei; Fan Hung-chang; Hsu Guo-zhan; Huang Kai-ho; Lin Yu-hsien | China; Liang Yunhai; Liu Guoyin; Liu Yue; Zhan Genghao |
| Women's singles | Dwi Tiga Putri; Indonesia | Siripat Karinit; Thailand | Nguyễn Huyền Trang; Vietnam |
| Women's singles | Dwi Tiga Putri; Indonesia | Siripat Karinit; Thailand | Phan Thị Phượng; Vietnam |
| Women's team | Vietnam; Nguyễn Huyền Trang; Nguyễn Thị Phương; Phan Thị Phượng; Phùng Thị Thương | Thailand; Jiraporn Chinpukdee; Siripat Karinit; Klissana Khaodee; Autchara Thongnim | China; Chen Linlin; Fang Yuanxiao; Xu Wangqian; Xu Yanqing |
| Women's team | Vietnam; Nguyễn Huyền Trang; Nguyễn Thị Phương; Phan Thị Phượng; Phùng Thị Thương | Thailand; Jiraporn Chinpukdee; Siripat Karinit; Klissana Khaodee; Autchara Thongnim | Chinese Taipei; Lee Ting-fang; Lin Shi-chun; Wu Chih-han; Ye Jia-yu |

== Medal table ==
| Rank | Nation | Gold | Silver | Bronze | Total |
|---|---|---|---|---|---|
| 1 | Thailand (THA) | 6 | 5 | 0 | 11 |
| 2 | Vietnam (VIE) | 1 | 0 | 3 | 4 |
| 3 | Indonesia (INA) | 1 | 0 | 2 | 3 |
| 4 | Chinese Taipei (TPE) | 0 | 3 | 2 | 5 |
| 5 | China (CHN) | 0 | 0 | 5 | 5 |
| Totals (5 entries) | | 8 | 8 | 12 | 28 |

== Results ==
=== Stroke ===
==== Men's singles ====
15–19 November

| Rank | Athlete | Prel. | Final |
|---|---|---|---|
| 1st place, gold medalist(s) | Klayut Mongkholsamai (THA) | 144 | 187 |
| 2nd place, silver medalist(s) | Wattana Phromkaew (THA) | 152 | 194 |
| 3 | Chinnakrit Imkrajang (THA) | 165 | 199 |
| 3rd place, bronze medalist(s) | Ye Qiwei (CHN) | 162 | 206 |
| 5 | Weerasak Srisamoot (THA) | 166 | 207 |
| 6 | Tan Mingyang (CHN) | 167 | 209 |
| 7 | Hsiao Chia-hung (TPE) | 172 | 212 |
| 8 | Hung Chia-tse (TPE) | 173 | 212 |
| 9 | Ismail Abdul Rahman (MAS) | 172 | 214 |
| 10 | Nakorn Nualraksa (THA) | 173 | |
| 11 | Jeremy Ngai (HKG) | 174 | |
| 12 | Hamkar Abdul Ghaffar (MAS) | 175 | |
| 12 | Nguyễn Văn Nam (VIE) | 175 | |
| 14 | Wang Xinbing (CHN) | 176 | |
| 15 | Azmi Ahmad (MAS) | 178 | |
| 16 | Lam Chi Ho (HKG) | 178 | |
| 17 | Lee Kuei-chang (TPE) | 179 | |
| 18 | Huang Ming-ting (TPE) | 180 | |
| 19 | Abdullah Ahmad (MAS) | 181 | |
| 20 | Vũ Hồng Quân (VIE) | 181 | |
| 21 | Deng Kezhou (CHN) | 182 | |
| 22 | Ho Sheng-hui (TPE) | 183 | |
| 23 | Ko Yun Tao (HKG) | 185 | |
| 24 | Lin Hsin-cheng (TPE) | 186 | |
| 25 | Zhou Yi (CHN) | 186 | |
| 26 | Sharnuddin Ngah (MAS) | 186 | |
| 26 | Punnavich Polburi (THA) | 186 | |
| 28 | Zahir Mohd Zain (MAS) | 188 | |
| 29 | Lee Hon Kwong (HKG) | 189 | |
| 30 | Wong Siu Kai (HKG) | 195 | |
| 31 | Mohammed Al-Niyadi (OMA) | 202 | |
| 32 | Chow Wai Kin (HKG) | 204 | |
| 33 | Abdullah Al-Mukhaini (OMA) | 206 | |
| 34 | Said Al-Farsi (OMA) | 207 | |
| 35 | Mohammed Al-Hinai (OMA) | 212 | |
| 36 | Ahmed Al-Farsi (OMA) | 221 | |
| 37 | Asim Al-Hadidi (OMA) | 224 | |
| 38 | Juma Al-Hinai (OMA) | 226 | |
| 39 | Zhang Feng (CHN) | 232 | |
| 40 | Nadheer Al-Amri (OMA) | 255 | |

- Ye Qiwei was awarded bronze because of no three-medal sweep per country rule.

==== Men's team ====
15–18 November

| Rank | Team | Score |
|---|---|---|
| 1st place, gold medalist(s) | Thailand (THA) | 612 |
| 2nd place, silver medalist(s) | Chinese Taipei (TPE) | 671 |
| 3rd place, bronze medalist(s) | China (CHN) | 678 |
| 4 | Malaysia (MAS) | 680 |
| 5 | Hong Kong (HKG) | 699 |
| 6 | Oman (OMA) | 835 |

==== Women's singles ====
15–19 November

| Rank | Athlete | Prel. | Final |
|---|---|---|---|
| 1st place, gold medalist(s) | Praewpan Chaithong (THA) | 158 | 206 |
| 2nd place, silver medalist(s) | Pornpimon Buaklang (THA) | 171 | 213 |
| 3 | Chonnipa Pengwichai (THA) | 169 | 215 |
| 3rd place, bronze medalist(s) | Chiang Fang-yu (TPE) | 180 | 218 |
| 5 | Cai Yi-ting (TPE) | 177 | 219 |
| 6 | Chung Pi-ju (TPE) | 178 | 222 |
| 7 | Jenjira Rachaseemuang (THA) | 177 | 223 |
| 8 | Hong Yu-mei (TPE) | 176 | 223 |
| 9 | Ika Yulianingsih (INA) | 183 | 227 |
| 10 | Ngô Thị Ngọc Hồng (VIE) | 184 | |
| 11 | Srisuda Bootju (THA) | 185 | |
| 12 | Jian Man-jun (TPE) | 187 | |
| 13 | Wong Nga Chun (HKG) | 187 | |
| 14 | Thanchanok Sareepan (THA) | 189 | |
| 15 | Li Yifeng (CHN) | 190 | |
| 16 | Hao Jingjie (CHN) | 193 | |
| 17 | Chan Yuk Ngan (HKG) | 196 | |
| 18 | Wang Ping (CHN) | 197 | |
| 19 | Lan Qiu (CHN) | 202 | |
| 20 | Ng Cho Kwan (HKG) | 205 | |
| 21 | Winnie Wong (HKG) | 207 | |
| 22 | Ko Wing Yan (HKG) | 209 | |
| 23 | Guan Ting (CHN) | 212 | |
| 24 | Zhu Xiaojing (CHN) | 213 | |
| 25 | Zainal Akmal Awang (MAS) | 214 | |
| 26 | Aniah Hassan (MAS) | 216 | |
| 27 | Wang Chin-tsu (TPE) | 218 | |
| 28 | Nur Syahirah Ahmad Shukri (MAS) | 220 | |
| 29 | Widilestari Setianingsih (MAS) | 225 | |
| 30 | Siti Syamimi Rahman (MAS) | 227 | |
| 31 | Ng Lai Ling (HKG) | 228 | |
| — | Ria Natasya Zulkefli (MAS) | DNS | |

- Chiang Fang-yu was awarded bronze because of no three-medal sweep per country rule.

==== Women's team ====
15–18 November

| Rank | Team | Score |
|---|---|---|
| 1st place, gold medalist(s) | Thailand (THA) | 663 |
| 2nd place, silver medalist(s) | Chinese Taipei (TPE) | 692 |
| 3rd place, bronze medalist(s) | China (CHN) | 764 |
| 4 | Hong Kong (HKG) | 772 |
| 5 | Malaysia (MAS) | 855 |

=== Fairway ===
==== Men's singles ====
14 November

Round 1
Siraphop Wannapin (THA) | 3
Juma Al-Hinai (OMA) | 1
Fan Hung-chang (TPE) | 3
Liu Yue (CHN) | 1
Liang Yunhai (CHN) | 2
Peera Chaisongkram (THA) | 3
Trần Duy Anh (VIE) | 3
Ahmed Al-Farsi (OMA) | 0

Round 2
Phạm Công Thành (VIE) | 2
Siraphop Wannapin (THA) | 3
Fan Hung-chang (TPE) | 0
Ahris Sumariyanto (INA) | 2
Hsu Guo-zhan (TPE) | 1
Peera Chaisongkram (THA) | 2
Trần Duy Anh (VIE) | 0
Marga Nugraha Susilo (INA) | 3

Round 3
Siraphop Wannapin (THA) | 3
Ahris Sumariyanto (INA) | 2
Peera Chaisongkram (THA) | 3
Marga Nugraha Susilo (INA) | 1

Final
Siraphop Wannapin (THA) | 2
Peera Chaisongkram (THA) | 3

==== Men's team ====
| Round 1; 15 November | | Round 2; 16 November | | Final; 17 November |
| | | Thailand | 3 |
| Vietnam | 2 | Vietnam | 0 |
| Malaysia | 1 | | | Thailand | 3 |
| Chinese Taipei | 3 | | | Chinese Taipei | 0 |
| Oman | 0 | Chinese Taipei | 3 |
| Indonesia | 1 | China | 0 |
| China | 2 |

==== Women's singles ====
14 November

Round 1
Jiraporn Chinpukdee (THA) | 2
Lin Shi-chun (TPE) | 1

Round 2
Dwi Tiga Putri (INA) | 4
Jiraporn Chinpukdee (THA) | 3
Xu Wangqian (CHN) | 1
Nguyễn Huyền Trang (VIE) | 2
Xu Yanqing (CHN) | 2
Siripat Karinit (THA) | 3
Phan Thị Phượng (VIE) | 3
Wu Chih-han (TPE) | 0

Round 3
Dwi Tiga Putri (INA) | 4
Nguyễn Huyền Trang (VIE) | 1
Siripat Karinit (THA) | 4
Phan Thị Phượng (VIE) | 0

Final
Dwi Tiga Putri (INA) | 3
Siripat Karinit (THA) | 2

==== Women's team ====
| Round 1; 15 November | | Round 2; 16 November | | Final; 17 November |
| | | Thailand | 2 |
| Malaysia | 0 | China | 1 |
| China | 1 | | | Thailand | 0 |
| | | | | Vietnam | 3 |
| | | Chinese Taipei | 0 |
| | | Vietnam | 3 |
