= Athletics at the 2013 SEA Games – Men's 100 metres =

The men's 100 metres at the 2013 SEA Games, was part of the athletics events held in Naypyidaw, Myanmar. The track and field events took place at the Wunna Theikdi Stadiumon December 17.

== Schedule ==
All times are Myanmar Standard Time (UTC+06:30)

Date	Time	Event
Tuesday, 17 December 2013	09:20	Heats
Tuesday, 17 December 2013	14:40	Final

== Records ==
Prior to this competition, the existing world, Asian, and Southeast Asian Games records were as follows.

World Record	Usain Bolt (JAM)	9.58 (+0.9 m/s)	Berlin, Germany	16 August 2009
Asian Record	Samuel Francis (QAT)	9.99 (+0.9 m/s)	Amman, Jordan	26 July 2007
Games Record	Suryo Agung Wibowo (INA)	10.17	Vientiane, Laos	13 December 2009

== Results ==
Legend

- DSQ — Disqualified
- DNF — Do Not Finish

=== Round 1 ===
==== Heat 1 ====
- Wind: +0.1 m/s

Rank	Lane	Athlete	Time	Notes
1	2	Jirapong Meenapra (THA)	10.56	
2	4	Iswandi Iswandi (INA)	10.68	
3	5	Foo Ee Gary Yeo (SIN)	10.81	
4	3	Mohd Azhar Md Ismail (MAS)	10.91	
5	6	Nay Aung (MYA)	11.59	

==== Heat 2 ====
- Wind: +0.5 m/s

Rank	Lane	Athlete	Time	Notes
1	5	Sapwaturrahman Sapwaturrahman (INA)	10.64	
2	7	Muhammad Amirudin Jamal (SIN)	10.67	
3	4	Aphisit Promkaew (THA)	10.72	
4	2	Nguyen Van Huynh (VIE)	10.73	
5	6	Eddie Edward Jr (MAS)	10.77	
6	3	Lin Zayar Naung (MYA)	11.39	

=== Final ===
- Wind: +0.7 m/s

Rank	Lane	Athlete	Time	Notes
1st place, gold medalist(s)	3	Jirapong Meenapra (THA)	10.48	
2nd place, silver medalist(s)	6	Iswandi Iswandi (INA)	10.51	
3rd place, bronze medalist(s)	5	Muhammad Amirudin Jamal (SIN)	10.55	
4	7	Sapwaturrahman Sapwaturrahman (INA)	10.65	
5	4	Foo Ee Gary Yeo (SIN)	10.70	
6	8	Nguyen Van Huynh (VIE)	10.75	
7	1	Eddie Edward Jr (MAS)	10.75	
8	2	Aphisit Promkaew (THA)	10.76	
