= Footvolley at the 2014 Asian Beach Games =

- Venue: Patong Beach
- Dates: 14–15 November 2014

Footvolley competition at the 2014 Asian Beach Games was held in Phuket, Thailand from 14 to 15 November 2014 at Patong Beach.

== Medalists ==
Event	Gold	Silver	Bronze
Men	Thailand; Thanee Ruangsri; Winai Thonglai	Iran; Hamed Shadan; Majid Salmani	Malaysia; Badri Daud; Zhafran Zharif
Men	Thailand; Thanee Ruangsri; Winai Thonglai	Iran; Hamed Shadan; Majid Salmani	United Arab Emirates; Jamal Al-Ali; Mohamed Al-Suwaidi

== Results ==
=== Preliminary ===
==== Pool A ====
Pos	Team	Pld	W	L	SF	SA	Pts
1	Thailand	3	3	0	6	0	3
2	Iran	3	2	1	4	2	2
3	Vietnam	3	1	2	2	4	1
4	South Korea	3	0	3	0	6	0

Source: OCA

Date		Score		Set 1	Set 2	Set 3
14 Nov	Thailand	2–0	Vietnam	18–1	18–6	
14 Nov	South Korea	0–2	Iran	13–18	5–18	
14 Nov	Thailand	2–0	South Korea	18–0	18–5	
14 Nov	Vietnam	0–2	Iran	9–18	11–18	
14 Nov	Thailand	2–0	Iran	18–6	13–3^{r}	
14 Nov	Vietnam	2–0	South Korea	18–11	19–17	

==== Pool B ====
Pos	Team	Pld	W	L	SF	SA	Pts
1	United Arab Emirates	4	4	0	8	1	4
2	Malaysia	4	3	1	7	2	3
3	Laos	4	2	2	4	4	2
4	Cambodia	4	1	3	2	6	1
5	India	4	0	4	0	8	0

Source: OCA

Date		Score		Set 1	Set 2	Set 3
14 Nov	United Arab Emirates	2–0	India	18–8	18–3	
14 Nov	Laos	0–2	Malaysia	13–18	7–18	
14 Nov	India	0–2	Laos	4–18	4–18	
14 Nov	Malaysia	2–0	Cambodia	18–11	18–10	
14 Nov	United Arab Emirates	2–0	Laos	19–17	18–13	
14 Nov	India	0–2	Cambodia	7–18	10–18	
14 Nov	United Arab Emirates	2–1	Malaysia	18–11	13–18	15–10
14 Nov	Laos	2–0	Cambodia	18–13	18–7	
14 Nov	United Arab Emirates	2–0	Cambodia	18–16	19–17	
14 Nov	India	0–2	Malaysia	3–18	4–18	

=== Knockout round ===
15 November

Semifinals			Gold medal match
Thailand	18	18
Malaysia	5	2	Thailand	18	18
Iran	18	18	Iran	8	11
United Arab Emirates	10	12
