= Beach athletics at the 2014 Asian Beach Games =

- Venue: Naiyang Beach
- Dates: 19–22 November 2014

Beach athletics competition at the 2014 Asian Beach Games was held in Phuket, Thailand from 19 to 22 November 2014 at Naiyang Beach, 5 minutes away from Phuket International Airport. There were seven women's events in original program but high jump and shot put events were cancelled due to lack of entries.

== Medalists ==
=== Men ===
Event	Gold		Silver		Bronze	
60 m	Iswandi; Indonesia	7.10	Reza Ghasemi; Iran	7.17	Ruttanapon Sowan; Thailand	7.22
4 × 60 m relay	Thailand; Jirapong Meenapra; Aphisit Promkaew; Kritsada Namsuwan; Ruttanapon Sowan	27.17	Kazakhstan; Omirserik Bekenov; Yevgeniy Ektov; Roman Valiyev; Rustem Almagambetov	29.60	Qatar; Abdulla Atiq; Issa Al-Jassim; Ibrahim Moussa Adam; Abdulrahman Al-Dosari	29.75
Cross-country	Bilisuma Shugi; Bahrain	28:41	Aweke Ayalew; Bahrain	29:01	Abubaker Ali Kamal; Qatar	29:13
Cross-country team	Bahrain; Aweke Ayalew; Julius Kalekem; Dejenee Regassa; Bilisuma Shugi	7	Iran; Mohammad Reza Aboutorabi; Mohammad Jafar Moradi; Mohammad Javad Sayyadi	20	Qatar; Mohamed El-Nazir; Abubaker Ali Kamal; Hashim Salah Mohamed; Maaz Abdelrahman Shagag	28
High jump	Majdeddin Ghazal; Syria	1.98	Yuriy Dergachev; Kazakhstan	1.94	Muamer Barsham; Qatar	1.90
Long jump	Sobhan Taherkhani; Iran	7.28	Mohammad Al-Salameh; Syria	6.98	Supanara Sukhasvasti; Thailand	6.96
Shot put	Ahmad Gholoum; Kuwait	18.69	Mashari Suroor; Kuwait	18.67	Ivan Ivanov; Kazakhstan	17.42

=== Women ===
Event	Gold		Silver		Bronze	
60 m	Khanrutai Pakdee; Thailand	8.06	Tassaporn Wannakit; Thailand	8.15	Viktoriya Zyabkina; Kazakhstan	8.16
4 × 60 m relay	Thailand; Jintara Seangdee; Phatsorn Jaksuninkorn; Tassaporn Wannakit; Khanrutai Pakdee	29.97	Kazakhstan; Rima Kashafutdinova; Svetlana Ivanchukova; Anastassiya Tulapina; Viktoriya Zyabkina	32.05	Indonesia; Triyani Pamungkas; Aprilia Kartina; Lismawati Illang; Serafi Anelies Unani	35.47
Cross-country	Tejitu Daba; Bahrain	23:39	Gladys Kibiwot; Bahrain	24:04	Yiu Kit Ching; Hong Kong	24:48
Cross-country team	Bahrain; Tejitu Daba; Jemila Kedir; Gladys Kibiwot	7	Indonesia; Lismawati Illang; Aprilia Kartina; Triyani Pamungkas	18	Thailand; Tanaphon Assawawongcharoen; Siriyakorn Kamlai; Souneega Prichaprong; Sonthiya Saiwaew; Natthaya Thanaronnawat	28
Long jump	Thitima Muangjan; Thailand	5.52	Bùi Thị Thu Thảo; Vietnam	5.35	Yekaterina Ektova; Kazakhstan	5.26

== Medal table ==
Rank	Nation	Gold	Silver	Bronze	Total
1	Bahrain (BRN)	4	2	0	6
2	Thailand (THA)	4	1	3	8
3	Iran (IRI)	1	2	0	3
4	Indonesia (INA)	1	1	1	3
5	Kuwait (KUW)	1	1	0	2
5	Syria (SYR)	1	1	0	2
7	Kazakhstan (KAZ)	0	3	3	6
8	Vietnam (VIE)	0	1	0	1
9	Qatar (QAT)	0	0	4	4
10	Hong Kong (HKG)	0	0	1	1
Totals (10 entries)		12	12	12	36

== Results ==
=== Men ===
==== 60 m ====
20 November

Rank	Athlete	Time
1st place, gold medalist(s)	Iswandi (INA)	7.10
2nd place, silver medalist(s)	Reza Ghasemi (IRI)	7.17
3rd place, bronze medalist(s)	Ruttanapon Sowan (THA)	7.22
4	Jirapong Meenapra (THA)	7.28
5	Masbah Ahmmed (BAN)	7.46
6	Abdulrahman Al-Dosari (QAT)	7.51
7	Rustem Almagambetov (KAZ)	7.52
8	Ibrahim Moussa Adam (QAT)	7.73

==== 4 × 60 m relay ====
22 November

Rank	Team	Time
1st place, gold medalist(s)	Thailand (THA)	27.17
2nd place, silver medalist(s)	Kazakhstan (KAZ)	29.60
3rd place, bronze medalist(s)	Qatar (QAT)	29.75
4	Iran (IRI)	30.68

==== Cross-country ====
21 November

Rank	Athlete	Time
1st place, gold medalist(s)	Bilisuma Shugi (BRN)	28:41
2nd place, silver medalist(s)	Aweke Ayalew (BRN)	29:01
3rd place, bronze medalist(s)	Abubaker Ali Kamal (QAT)	29:13
4	Dejenee Regassa (BRN)	29:14
5	Mohammad Jafar Moradi (IRI)	29:54
6	Julius Kalekem (BRN)	30:00
7	Mohammad Reza Aboutorabi (IRI)	30:13
8	Mohammad Javad Sayyadi (IRI)	30:45
9	Sanchai Namkhet (THA)	31:33
10	Boonthung Srisung (THA)	31:39
11	Maaz Abdelrahman Shagag (QAT)	32:12
12	Nur Shodiq (INA)	32:17
13	Atjong Tio Purwanto (INA)	32:36
14	Mohamed El-Nazir (QAT)	32:58
15	Nattawat Innum (THA)	33:04
16	Somkid Liomanongoen (THA)	33:04
17	Cao Trình Điền (VIE)	33:16
18	Hendro (INA)	33:32
19	Hashim Salah Mohamed (QAT)	34:48
—	Bilal Bilano (INA)	DNF
—	Huỳnh Trọng Sơn (VIE)	DNF
—	Sutat Kallayanakitti (THA)	DNF
—	Nguyễn Quốc Dung (VIE)	DNF
—	Nguyễn Văn Vinh (VIE)	DNF
—	Phùng Văn Quyết (VIE)	DNF
—	Zelalem Bacha (BRN)	DNF
—	Wan Cheuk Hei (HKG)	DNF
—	Musab Adam Ali (QAT)	DNF

==== Cross-country team ====
21 November

Rank	Team	Score
1st place, gold medalist(s)	Bahrain (BRN)	7
2nd place, silver medalist(s)	Iran (IRI)	20
3rd place, bronze medalist(s)	Qatar (QAT)	28
4	Thailand (THA)	34
5	Indonesia (INA)	43
—	Vietnam (VIE)	DNF

==== High jump ====
20 November

Rank	Athlete	Result
1st place, gold medalist(s)	Majdeddin Ghazal (SYR)	1.98
2nd place, silver medalist(s)	Yuriy Dergachev (KAZ)	1.94
3rd place, bronze medalist(s)	Muamer Barsham (QAT)	1.90
4	Mohammad Reza Vazifehdoust (IRI)	1.90
5	Pramote Pumurai (THA)	1.80
6	Azizdzhon Kosimov (TJK)	1.75
7	Narongrit Ketsaeng (THA)	1.75

==== Long jump ====
19 November

Rank	Athlete	Result
1st place, gold medalist(s)	Sobhan Taherkhani (IRI)	7.28
2nd place, silver medalist(s)	Mohammad Al-Salameh (SYR)	6.98
3rd place, bronze medalist(s)	Supanara Sukhasvasti (THA)	6.96
4	Saleh Al-Haddad (KUW)	6.92
5	Phạm Văn Lâm (VIE)	6.84
6	Roman Valiyev (KAZ)	6.57
7	Yevgeniy Ektov (KAZ)	6.40
8	Varunyoo Kongnil (THA)	6.18
9	Azizdzhon Kosimov (TJK)	5.10

==== Shot put ====
19 November

Rank	Athlete	Result
1st place, gold medalist(s)	Ahmad Gholoum (KUW)	18.69
2nd place, silver medalist(s)	Mashari Suroor (KUW)	18.67
3rd place, bronze medalist(s)	Ivan Ivanov (KAZ)	17.42
4	Thawat Khachin (THA)	16.59
5	Promrob Juntima (THA)	16.56
6	Ismail Mohamad Kaseem (QAT)	15.57
7	Lam Wai (HKG)	14.14

=== Women ===
==== 60 m ====
20 November

Rank	Athlete	Time
1st place, gold medalist(s)	Khanrutai Pakdee (THA)	8.06
2nd place, silver medalist(s)	Tassaporn Wannakit (THA)	8.15
3rd place, bronze medalist(s)	Viktoriya Zyabkina (KAZ)	8.16
4	Serafi Anelies Unani (INA)	8.31
5	Rima Kashafutdinova (KAZ)	8.39
6	Shirin Akter (BAN)	8.68

==== 4 × 60 m relay ====
22 November

Rank	Team	Time
1st place, gold medalist(s)	Thailand (THA)	29.97
2nd place, silver medalist(s)	Kazakhstan (KAZ)	32.05
3rd place, bronze medalist(s)	Indonesia (INA)	35.47
4	Vietnam (VIE)	38.35

==== Cross-country ====
21 November

Rank	Athlete	Time
1st place, gold medalist(s)	Tejitu Daba (BRN)	23:39
2nd place, silver medalist(s)	Gladys Kibiwot (BRN)	24:04
3rd place, bronze medalist(s)	Yiu Kit Ching (HKG)	24:48
4	Jemila Kedir (BRN)	25:23
5	Aprilia Kartina (INA)	25:38
6	Triyani Pamungkas (INA)	25:40
7	Lismawati Illang (INA)	25:41
8	Natthaya Thanaronnawat (THA)	25:47
9	Souneega Prichaprong (THA)	26:28
10	Nguyễn Thị Mỹ Chi (VIE)	26:56
11	Tanaphon Assawawongcharoen (THA)	27:08
12	Siriyakorn Kamlai (THA)	27:17
13	Trương Thị Lệ Thủy (VIE)	27:29
14	Võ Thị Mỹ Ngân (VIE)	27:47
15	Nguyễn Thị Khánh Quyên (VIE)	28:22
16	Sonthiya Saiwaew (THA)	29:03
17	Hồ Thị Bích Trang (VIE)	32:35

==== Cross-country team ====
21 November

Rank	Team	Score
1st place, gold medalist(s)	Bahrain (BRN)	7
2nd place, silver medalist(s)	Indonesia (INA)	18
3rd place, bronze medalist(s)	Thailand (THA)	28
4	Vietnam (VIE)	37

==== Long jump ====
22 November

Rank	Athlete	Result
1st place, gold medalist(s)	Thitima Muangjan (THA)	5.52
2nd place, silver medalist(s)	Bùi Thị Thu Thảo (VIE)	5.35
3rd place, bronze medalist(s)	Yekaterina Ektova (KAZ)	5.26
4	Irina Ektova (KAZ)	5.08
5	Phạm Văn Lâm (VIE)	6.84
6	Sunisa Khotseemueang (THA)	4.97
