= Kazakhstan at the 2014 Asian Beach Games =

- IOC code: KAZ
- NOC: National Olympic Committee of the Republic of Kazakhstan

in Phuket
- Medals Ranked 6th: Gold 8 Silver 9 Bronze 10 Total 27

Asian Beach Games appearances
- 2008; 2010; 2012; 2014; 2016; 2026

Kazakhstan participated in the 2014 Asian Beach Games in Phuket, Thailand from 14 to 23 November 2014.

== Medal summary ==
=== Medal by sport ===
Medals by sport
Sport	1st place, gold medalist(s)	2nd place, silver medalist(s)	3rd place, bronze medalist(s)	Total
Beach Athletics	0	3	3	6
Beach Modern Pentathlon	0	0	1	1
Beach Volleyball	1	0	0	1
Beach Water Polo	1	0	0	1
Beach Wrestling	1	0	2	3
Marathon Swimming	1	1	0	2
Muaythai	1	2	1	4
Sambo	1	2	1	4
Sport Climbing	2	1	2	5
Total	8	9	10	27

=== Medal by Date ===
Medals by date
Day	Date	1st place, gold medalist(s)	2nd place, silver medalist(s)	3rd place, bronze medalist(s)	Total
–1	12 Nov	0	2	1	3
0	13 Nov	1	0	0	1
1	14 Nov	0	0	0	0
2	15 Nov	1	1	2	4
3	16 Nov	1	0	2	3
4	17 Nov	1	1	0	2
5	18 Nov	0	0	0	0
6	19 Nov	0	0	1	1
7	20 Nov	0	1	1	2
8	21 Nov	0	0	2	2
9	22 Nov	3	4	1	8
10	23 Nov	1	0	0	1
Total		8	9	10	27
