= Cambodia at the 2013 World Championships in Athletics =

- WA code: CAM

in Moscow
- Competitors: 1
- Medals: Gold 0 Silver 0 Bronze 0 Total 0

World Championships in Athletics appearances
- 1983; 1987–1995; 1997; 1999; 2001–2003; 2005; 2007; 2009; 2011; 2013; 2015; 2017; 2019; 2022–2023; 2025

Cambodia competed at the 2013 World Championships in Athletics in Moscow, Russia, from 10–18 August 2013. A team of one athlete was announced to represent the country in the event.

== Results ==
Athlete	Event	Heats		Semifinals		Final	
Athlete	Event	Time	Rank	Time	Rank	Time	Rank
Samorn Kieng	800 metres	1:55.17 SB	44	did not advance			
