= Athletics at the 2015 SEA Games – Men's 100 metres =

Athletics – Men's 100 metres at the 2015 SEA Games
- Venue: Nation stadium
- Date: 9 June 2015
- Competitors: 14 from 9 nations

Medalists
gold medal	Eric Shauwn Cray	Philippines
silver medal	Yaspi Boby	Indonesia
bronze medal	Iswandi Iswandi	Indonesia

The men's 100 metres competition of the athletics event at the 2015 SEA Games was held on 9 June at the National Stadium in Singapore. Eric Shauwn Cray of the Philippines won the gold medal.

== Records ==
Prior to this competition, the existing Asian and Games records were as follows:

Asian record	Femi Ogunode (QAT)	9.93	Incheon, South Korea	28 September 2014
Games record	Suryo Agung Wibowo (INA)	10.17	Vientiane, Laos	13 December 2009

== Schedule ==
All times are Singapore Standard Time (UTC+08:00)

Date	Time	Event
Saturday, 9 June 2015	10:35	Heat 1
Saturday, 9 June 2015	10:45	Heat 2
Saturday, 9 June 2015	17:50	Final

== Results ==
=== Round 1 ===
Source: Results Summary

- Qualification: First 3 in each heat (Q) and the next 2 fastest (q) advance to the final.

==== Heat 1 ====
Source: Results Heat 1

- Wind: +0.3 m/s

Rank	Athlete	Time	Notes
1	Eric Shauwn Cray (PHI)	10.28	Q, PB
2	Jirapong Meenapra (THA)	10.42	Q
3	Iswandi Iswandi (INA)	10.43	Q, SB
4	Muhammad Amirudin Jamal (SIN)	10.49	q, SB
5	Mohd Izzuddin Yahaya (MAS)	10.61	
6	Md Asy Syafi'e Md Bohari (BRU)	10.67	PB
7	Sengpheth Phomphady (LAO)	11.34	

==== Heat 2 ====
Source: Results Heat 2

- Wind: 0.0 m/s

Rank	Athlete	Time	Notes
1	Boby Yaspi (INA)	10.48	Q
2	Calvin Kang Li Loong (SIN)	10.50	Q
3	Ismail Md Fakhri (BRU)	10.59	Q, PB
4	Lê Trọng Hình (VIE)	10.59	q
5	Kennedy Nixson Anak (MAS)	10.65	
6	Phearath Nget (CAM)	10.87	PB
7	Khentan One Nanthavath (LAO)	11.59	

=== Final ===
Source: Result Final

- Wind: 0.0 m/s

Rank	Athlete	Time	Notes
1st place, gold medalist(s)	Eric Shauwn Cray (PHI)	10.25	PB, NR
2nd place, silver medalist(s)	Boby Yaspi (INA)	10.45	
3rd place, bronze medalist(s)	Iswandi Iswandi (INA)	10.45	
4	Calvin Kang Li Loong (SIN)	10.47	PB
5	Jirapong Meenapra (THA)	10.48	
6	Muhammad Amirudin Jamal (SIN)	10.55	
7	Lê Trọng Hinh (VIE)	10.55	
8	Mohd Fakhri Ismail (BRU)	10.67	

== See also ==
- Official website
