= Jet ski at the 2025 SEA Games =

Jet skiing at the 2025 SEA Games
- Venue: Jomtien Beach; Samae Beach, Ko Lan
- Location: Chonburi, Thailand
- Dates: 11–14 December 2025
- Nations: 6

Jet ski competitions at the 2025 SEA Games took place at Jomtien Beach and Samae Beach in Chonburi, Thailand from 11 to 14 December 2025. Medals were awarded in 6 events.

== Participating nations ==
- Cambodia (withdrew)
- Indonesia
- Malaysia
- Philippines
- Thailand (host)
- Vietnam

== Medal table ==
* Host nation (Thailand)

Rank	Nation	Gold	Silver	Bronze	Total
1	Thailand*	5	4	1	10
2	Indonesia	1	0	1	2
3	Philippines	0	2	4	6
Totals (3 entries)		6	6	6	18

== Medalists ==
Event	Gold	Silver	Bronze
Endurance open	Aero Sutan Aswar; Indonesia	Tapatarawat Joesonnusont; Thailand	Marchael Louie Buhisan; Philippines
Runabout stock	Permphon Teerapatpanich; Thailand	Teera Settura; Thailand	Aqsa Sutan Aswar; Indonesia
Runabout 1100 stock	Sasina Phiwngam; Thailand	Kristine Kate Mercado; Philippines	Anton Nicolas Ignacio; Philippines
Runabout limited	Supak Settura; Thailand	Kasidit Teeraprateep; Thailand	Angelo Inigo Ventus; Philippines
Ski GP	Tanawin Molee; Thailand	Arnon Hongklang; Thailand	Cody Lorenzo Pontino; Philippines
Ski 1500 stock	Tanawid Molee; Thailand	Cody Lorenzo Pontino; Philippines	Nantawat Singurai; Thailand
