= Jet ski at the 2023 SEA Games =

- Venue: Sokha Beach
- Location: Sihanoukville, Cambodia
- Dates: 13–16 May 2023
- Nations: 5

Jet ski competitions at the 2023 SEA Games took place at Sokha Beach in Sihanoukville, Cambodia from 13 to 16 May 2023. Medals were awarded in 6 events. Jet ski made its debut competition this edition. The event was commentated by international jet ski racing announcer, Dawn Dawson.

== Participating nations ==
- Cambodia (host)
- Indonesia
- Malaysia
- Philippines
- Thailand

== Medal table ==
* Host nation (Cambodia)

Rank	Nation	Gold	Silver	Bronze	Total
1	Thailand	4	5	1	10
2	Cambodia*	1	1	2	4
3	Indonesia	1	0	2	3
4	Philippines	0	0	1	1
Totals (4 entries)		6	6	6	18

== Medalists ==
Event	Gold	Silver	Bronze
Endurance runabout open	Aero Sutan Aswar; Indonesia	Theerapong Pimpawat; Thailand	Aqsa Sutan Aswar; Indonesia
Runabout stock	Permphon Teerapatpanich; Thailand	Nuttakorn Pupakdee; Thailand	Aqsa Sutan Aswar; Indonesia
Runabout 1100 stock	Pianrat Srikongruk; Thailand	Sasina Phiwngam; Thailand	Billy Joseph Yang Ang; Philippines
Ski GP	Saly Ou Moeut; Cambodia	Min Mustan; Cambodia	Nantawat Singurai; Thailand
Ski lite	Arnon Hongklang; Thailand	Nantawat Singurai; Thailand	Saly Ou Moeut; Cambodia
Ski 1500 stock	Tanawin Molee; Thailand	Narathip Thongyoo; Thailand	Kay Vansiden; Cambodia
