= Jet ski at the 2014 Asian Beach Games =

- Venue: Patong Beach
- Dates: 17–19 November 2014

Jet ski competition at the 2014 Asian Beach Games was held in Phuket, Thailand from 17 to 19 November 2014 at Patong Beach, Phuket.

== Medalists ==
Event	Gold	Silver	Bronze
Runabout open	Chokuthit Molee; Thailand	Yousef Al-Abdulrazzaq; Kuwait	Aero Sutan Aswar; Indonesia
Runabout stock	Aqsa Sutan Aswar; Indonesia	Aero Sutan Aswar; Indonesia	Abdullah Al-Fadhel; Kuwait
Runabout 1000 superstock	Teerapong Khunjeng; Thailand	Abdullah Al-Fadhel; Kuwait	Teera Settura; Thailand
Runabout endurance open	Aero Sutan Aswar; Indonesia	Chalermpoj Viriyahphan; Thailand	Aqsa Sutan Aswar; Indonesia
Ski open	Veerapong Maneechom; Thailand	Almur Huraiz; United Arab Emirates	Nuttakorn Pupakdee; Thailand
Sport GP	Thanarwin Phakphokhai; Thailand	Supak Settura; Thailand	Abdullah Al-Fadhel; Kuwait

== Medal table ==
Rank	Nation	Gold	Silver	Bronze	Total
1	Thailand (THA)	4	2	2	8
2	Indonesia (INA)	2	1	2	5
3	Kuwait (KUW)	0	2	2	4
4	United Arab Emirates (UAE)	0	1	0	1
Totals (4 entries)		6	6	6	18

== Results ==
=== Runabout open ===
18 November

Rank	Athlete	Motor 1		Motor 2		Motor 3		Total
Rank	Athlete	Rank	Pts	Rank	Pts	Rank	Pts	Total
1st place, gold medalist(s)	Chokuthit Molee (THA)	1	60	1	60	2	53	173
2nd place, silver medalist(s)	Yousef Al-Abdulrazzaq (KUW)	4	43	2	53	1	60	156
3rd place, bronze medalist(s)	Aero Sutan Aswar (INA)	2	53	3	48	3	48	149
4	Abdullah Al-Fadhel (KUW)	3	48	5	39	4	43	130
5	Wu Ronghua (CHN)	5	39	4	43	5	39	121
6	Liu Yicheng (CHN)	6	36	6	36	7	33	105
7	Chaowalit Kuajaroon (THA)	8	30	7	33	6	36	99
8	Aqsa Sutan Aswar (INA)	7	33	DNF		DNF		33

=== Runabout stock ===
17 November

Rank	Athlete	Motor 1		Motor 2		Motor 3		Total
Rank	Athlete	Rank	Pts	Rank	Pts	Rank	Pts	Total
1st place, gold medalist(s)	Aqsa Sutan Aswar (INA)	1	60	2	53	3	48	161
2nd place, silver medalist(s)	Aero Sutan Aswar (INA)	8	30	1	60	2	53	143
3rd place, bronze medalist(s)	Abdullah Al-Fadhel (KUW)	2	53	9	27	1	60	140
4	Supak Settura (THA)	3	48	3	48	4	43	139
5	Thanapun Phangchunan (THA)	7	33	4	43	5	39	115
6	Billy Joseph Ang (PHI)	4	43	5	39	8	30	112
7	Tan Wei (CHN)	5	39	8	30	6	36	105
8	Qin Liguo (CHN)	6	36	6	36	7	33	105
9	Ahmad Al-Dawwas (KUW)	9	27	7	33	DNF		60

=== Runabout 1000 superstock ===
17 November

Rank	Athlete	Motor 1		Motor 2		Motor 3		Total
Rank	Athlete	Rank	Pts	Rank	Pts	Rank	Pts	Total
1st place, gold medalist(s)	Teerapong Khunjeng (THA)	1	60	2	53	1	60	173
2nd place, silver medalist(s)	Abdullah Al-Fadhel (KUW)	2	53	3	48	2	53	154
3rd place, bronze medalist(s)	Teera Settura (THA)	4	43	1	60	3	48	151
4	Yousef Al-Abdulrazzaq (KUW)	3	48	4	43	5	39	130
5	Xie Peishan (CHN)	7	33	5	39	4	43	115
6	Aero Sutan Aswar (INA)	5	39	6	36	DNF		75
7	Aqsa Sutan Aswar (INA)	6	36	DNF		DNF		36

=== Runabout endurance open ===
19 November

Rank	Athlete	Motor 1		Motor 2		Total
Rank	Athlete	Rank	Pts	Rank	Pts	Total
1st place, gold medalist(s)	Aero Sutan Aswar (INA)	2	380	1	400	780
2nd place, silver medalist(s)	Chalermpoj Viriyahphan (THA)	1	400	3	368	768
3rd place, bronze medalist(s)	Aqsa Sutan Aswar (INA)	6	348	2	380	728
4	Teera Settura (THA)	3	368	4	360	728
5	Ahmad Al-Dawwas (KUW)	4	360	7	344	704
6	Mohd Nayan Bakar (MAS)	5	352	6	348	700
7	Nur Azahari Ahmad Baddri (MAS)	7	344	5	352	696
8	Xu Chen (CHN)	8	340	8	340	680
9	Yang Liu (CHN)	9	336	9	336	672
10	Abdullah Al-Fadhel (KUW)	DNF		DNF		0
11	Almur Huraiz (UAE)	DNF		DNF		0

=== Ski open ===
17 November

Rank	Athlete	Motor 1		Motor 2		Motor 3		Total
Rank	Athlete	Rank	Pts	Rank	Pts	Rank	Pts	Total
1st place, gold medalist(s)	Veerapong Maneechom (THA)	1	60	2	53	2	53	166
2nd place, silver medalist(s)	Almur Huraiz (UAE)	6	36	1	60	1	60	156
3rd place, bronze medalist(s)	Nuttakorn Pupakdee (THA)	2	53	3	48	3	48	149
4	Yousef Al-Abdulrazzaq (KUW)	3	48	4	43	4	43	134
5	Yue Nixin (CHN)	4	43	DNF		5	39	82
6	Li Qianqian (CHN)	5	39	5	39	DNF		78

=== Sport GP ===
18 November

Rank	Athlete	Motor 1		Motor 2		Motor 3		Total
Rank	Athlete	Rank	Pts	Rank	Pts	Rank	Pts	Total
1st place, gold medalist(s)	Thanarwin Phakphokhai (THA)	2	53	2	53	1	60	166
2nd place, silver medalist(s)	Supak Settura (THA)	1	60	1	60	4	43	163
3rd place, bronze medalist(s)	Abdullah Al-Fadhel (KUW)	3	48	4	43	2	53	144
4	Yousef Al-Abdulrazzaq (KUW)	4	43	3	48	3	48	139
5	Liang Yazhou (CHN)	6	36	5	39	5	39	114
6	Aqsa Sutan Aswar (INA)	5	39	DNF		DNF		39
