= Aravinn Thevarr Gunasegaran =

Malaysian sprinter (born 1993)

G. Aravinn Thevarr
Personal information
- Full name: Aravinn Thevarr A/L Gunasegaran
- Nationality: Malaysian
- Born: 4 October 1993 (age 32) Ipoh, Perak, Malaysia
- Height: 1.82 m (5 ft 11 1/2 in)
- Weight: 68 kg (150 lb)

Sport
- Country: Malaysia
- Sport: Track and field
- Event: Sprinting
Medal record
Men's athletics
Southeast Asian Games
Bronze medal – third place	2017 Malaysia	200 m

Aravinn Thevarr A/L Gunasegaran (born 4 October 1993) is a Malaysian sprinter who primarily competes in the 100 metres and 200 metres.

== International competitions ==
Year	Competition	Venue	Position	Event	Notes
Representing Malaysia
2017	Southeast Asian Games	Kuala Lumpur, Malaysia	3rd	200 m	21.26
