= Qatar at the 2014 Asian Beach Games =

- IOC code: QAT
- NOC: Qatar Olympic Committee

in Phuket
- Medals Ranked 18th: Gold 2 Silver 2 Bronze 8 Total 12

Asian Beach Games appearances
- 2008; 2010; 2012; 2014; 2016; 2026

Qatar participated in the 2014 Asian Beach Games in Phuket, Thailand from 14 to 23 November 2014.

== Medal summary ==
=== Medal by sport ===
Medals by sport
Sport	1st place, gold medalist(s)	2nd place, silver medalist(s)	3rd place, bronze medalist(s)	Total
Air Sports	0	1	3	4
Beach Athletics	0	0	4	4
Beach Basketball	1	0	0	1
Beach Handball	1	0	0	1
Beach Volleyball	0	0	1	1
Beach Wrestling	0	1	0	1
Total	2	2	8	12

=== Medal by Date ===
Medals by date
Day	Date	1st place, gold medalist(s)	2nd place, silver medalist(s)	3rd place, bronze medalist(s)	Total
–1	12 Nov	0	0	0	0
0	13 Nov	0	0	0	0
1	14 Nov	0	0	0	0
2	15 Nov	0	1	0	1
3	16 Nov	0	0	0	0
4	17 Nov	0	0	0	0
5	18 Nov	1	0	0	1
6	19 Nov	0	0	0	0
7	20 Nov	0	0	3	3
8	21 Nov	0	1	3	4
9	22 Nov	1	0	1	2
10	23 Nov	0	0	1	1
Total		2	2	8	12
