= Cambodia at the 2019 World Athletics Championships =

Cambodia at the 2019 World Championships in Athletics
- WA code: CAM

in Doha
- Competitors: 1 (1 man) in 1 event
- Medals: Gold 0 Silver 0 Bronze 0 Total 0

World Championships in Athletics appearances
- 1983; 1987–1995; 1997; 1999; 2001–2003; 2005; 2007; 2009; 2011; 2013; 2015; 2017; 2019; 2022; 2023

Cambodia competed at the 2019 World Championships in Athletics in Doha, Qatar, 4–13 August 2019.

== Results ==
(q – qualified, NM – no mark, SB – season best)

=== Men ===
Track and road events

Athlete	Event	Preliminary Round		Heat		Semifinal		Final	
Athlete	Event	Result	Rank	Result	Rank	Result	Rank	Result	Rank
Viro Ma	5000 metres	DNF	-	Did not advance					
