= Sport climbing at the 2014 Asian Beach Games =

- Venue: Saphan Hin
- Dates: 15–16 November 2014

Sports climbing competition at the 2014 Asian Beach Games was held in Phuket, Thailand from 15 to 16 November 2014 at Saphan Hin Sports Center, Phuket.

== Medalists ==
=== Men ===
Event	Gold	Silver	Bronze
Speed	Aspar Jaelolo; Indonesia	Zhong Qixin; China	Rishat Khaibullin; Kazakhstan
Speed relay	Kazakhstan; Rishat Khaibullin; Amir Maimuratov; Alexey Molchanov	Thailand; Phanuphong Bunprakop; Thatthana Raksachat; Winai Ruangrit	Indonesia; Fajri Ashari; Nanang Ibrahim; Aspar Jaelolo

=== Women ===
Event	Gold	Silver	Bronze
Speed	Tamara Kuznetsova; Kazakhstan	Assel Marlenova; Kazakhstan	Tita Supita; Indonesia
Speed relay	China; He Cuilian; Pan Xuhua; Renqing Lamu	Indonesia; Ita Triana Purnamasari; Tita Supita; Santy Wellyanti	Kazakhstan; Tamara Kuznetsova; Assel Marlenova; Zhazira Myrzakhanova

== Medal table ==
Rank	Nation	Gold	Silver	Bronze	Total
1	Kazakhstan (KAZ)	2	1	2	5
2	Indonesia (INA)	1	1	2	4
3	China (CHN)	1	1	0	2
4	Thailand (THA)	0	1	0	1
Totals (4 entries)		4	4	4	12

== Results ==
=== Men ===
==== Speed ====
15 November

===== Qualifying =====
Rank	Athlete	Time
1	Aspar Jaelolo (INA)	6.60
2	Fajri Ashari (INA)	6.61
3	Zhong Qixin (CHN)	6.62
4	Amir Maimuratov (KAZ)	6.69
5	Hamid Reza Touzandeh (IRI)	6.91
6	Adriel Choo (SIN)	7.48
7	Rishat Khaibullin (KAZ)	7.52
8	Zhong Lincai (CHN)	7.55
9	Gregory Tay (SIN)	7.97
10	Choi Seung-bin (KOR)	8.05
11	Kim Hong-il (KOR)	8.12
12	Terdpol Artaui (THA)	9.31
13	Suphason Thanagongul (THA)	11.88
—	Reza Alipour (IRI)	DSQ

===== Knockout round =====
Quarterfinals
Aspar Jaelolo (INA)	6.66
Zhong Lincai (CHN)	8.51
Amir Maimuratov (KAZ)	6.85
Hamid Reza Touzandeh (IRI)	6.73
Fajri Ashari (INA)	Fall
Rishat Khaibullin (KAZ)	7.31
Zhong Qixin (CHN)	6.92
Adriel Choo (SIN)	8.12

Semifinals
Aspar Jaelolo (INA)	6.31
Hamid Reza Touzandeh (IRI)	6.64
Rishat Khaibullin (KAZ)	Fall
Zhong Qixin (CHN)	7.80

Final
Aspar Jaelolo (INA)	17.38
Zhong Qixin (CHN)	Fall
Small final
Hamid Reza Touzandeh (IRI)	Fall
Rishat Khaibullin (KAZ)	12.60

==== Speed relay ====
16 November

===== Qualifying =====
Rank	Team	Time
1	Kazakhstan (KAZ)	28.38
2	Indonesia (INA)	28.97
3	Thailand (THA)	30.97
4	China (CHN)	32.75
5	Singapore (SIN)	32.75
6	South Korea (KOR)	39.11
7	Iran (IRI)	45.08

===== Knockout round =====
Semifinals
Kazakhstan	27.69
China	29.20
Indonesia	29.33
Thailand	29.28

Final
Kazakhstan	27.71
Thailand	31.50
Small final
China	31.36
Indonesia	27.96

=== Women ===
==== Speed ====
15 November

===== Qualifying =====
Rank	Athlete	Time
1	Tamara Kuznetsova (KAZ)	9.85
2	Ita Triana Purnamasari (INA)	10.30
3	Assel Marlenova (KAZ)	11.09
4	Tita Supita (INA)	11.23
5	He Cuilian (CHN)	11.39
6	Janice Ng (SIN)	12.52
7	Renqing Lamu (CHN)	12.99
8	Pratthana Raksachat (THA)	13.23
9	Kim A-ra (KOR)	13.57
10	Jeon Ji-yeon (KOR)	15.06
11	Watchareewan Tomas (THA)	15.70

===== Knockout round =====
Quarterfinals
Tamara Kuznetsova (KAZ)	9.56
Pratthana Raksachat (THA)	13.46
Tita Supita (INA)	9.93
He Cuilian (CHN)	11.61
Ita Triana Purnamasari (INA)	12.40
Renqing Lamu (CHN)	Fall
Assel Marlenova (KAZ)	11.92
Janice Ng (SIN)	Fall

Semifinals
Tamara Kuznetsova (KAZ)	9.26
Tita Supita (INA)	9.27
Ita Triana Purnamasari (INA)	12.17
Assel Marlenova (KAZ)	10.75

Final
Tamara Kuznetsova (KAZ)	9.37
Assel Marlenova (KAZ)	9.40
Small final
Tita Supita (INA)	9.40
Ita Triana Purnamasari (INA)	9.54

==== Speed relay ====
16 November

===== Qualifying =====
Rank	Team	Time
1	Kazakhstan (KAZ)	44.76
2	Thailand (THA)	49.82
3	China (CHN)	49.88
4	Indonesia (INA)	50.54
5	South Korea (KOR)	1:01.95

===== Knockout round =====
Semifinals
Kazakhstan	42.17
Indonesia	41.29
Thailand	Fall
China	52.73

Final
Indonesia	Fall
China	44.68
Small final
Kazakhstan	43.35
Thailand	45.40
