= United Arab Emirates at the 2014 Asian Beach Games =

- IOC code: UAE
- NOC: United Arab Emirates National Olympic Committee

in Phuket
- Medals Ranked 11th: Gold 4 Silver 3 Bronze 5 Total 12

Asian Beach Games appearances
- 2008; 2010; 2012; 2014; 2016; 2026

United Arab Emirates participated in the 2014 Asian Beach Games in Phuket, Thailand from 14 to 23 November 2014.

== Medal summary ==
=== Medal by sport ===
Medals by sport
Sport	1st place, gold medalist(s)	2nd place, silver medalist(s)	3rd place, bronze medalist(s)	Total
Beach Soccer	0	0	1	1
Foot Volley	0	0	1	1
Jetski	0	1	0	1
Ju-Jitsu	4	2	3	9
Total	4	3	5	12

=== Medal by Date ===
Medals by date
Day	Date	1st place, gold medalist(s)	2nd place, silver medalist(s)	3rd place, bronze medalist(s)	Total
–1	12 Nov	3	1	3	7
0	13 Nov	1	1	0	2
1	14 Nov	0	0	0	0
2	15 Nov	0	0	1	1
3	16 Nov	0	0	0	0
4	17 Nov	0	1	0	1
5	18 Nov	0	0	0	0
6	19 Nov	0	0	0	0
7	20 Nov	0	0	0	0
8	21 Nov	0	0	1	1
9	22 Nov	0	0	0	0
10	23 Nov	0	0	0	0
Total		4	3	5	12
