= Iswandi =

Indonesian sprinter

Personal information
- Full name: Abdul Hamid Abdullah Iswandi
- Born: 1 January 1991 (age 35)
- Education: IKIP Mataram

Sport
- Sport: Track and field
- Event(s): 100 metres, 200 metres
Medal record
Men's athletics
Representing Indonesia
Asian Beach Games
Gold medal – first place	2014 Phuket	60 m
Islamic Solidarity Games
Bronze medal – third place	2013 Palembang	4x100 m relay
SEA Games
Silver medal – second place	2013 Naypyidaw	100 m
Silver medal – second place	2017 Kuala Lumpur	4×100 m relay
Bronze medal – third place	2013 Naypyidaw	4×100 m relay
Bronze medal – third place	2015 Singapore	100 m
ASEAN University Games
Gold medal – first place	2014 Palembang	100 m
Silver medal – second place	2016 Singapore	4x100 m relay
Bronze medal – third place	2016 Singapore	100 m

Abdul Hamid Abdullah Iswandi (born 1 January 1991) is an Indonesian athlete competing in sprinting events. He represented his country at the 2016 World Indoor Championships without advancing from the first round.

== Competition record ==
Year	Competition	Venue	Position	Event	Notes
Representing Indonesia
2011	Asian Championships	Kobe, Japan	10th (h)	4 × 100 m relay	40.52
2013	Universiade	Kazan, Russia	28th (qf)	100 m	10.80
2013	Islamic Solidarity Games	Palembang, Indonesia	3rd	4 × 100 m relay	40.37
2013	SEA Games	Naypyidaw, Myanmar	2nd	100 m	10.51
2013	SEA Games	Naypyidaw, Myanmar	3rd	4 × 100 m relay	40.15
2014	Asian Beach Games	Phuket, Thailand	1st	60 m	7.10
2014	ASEAN University Games	Palembang, Indonesia	1st	100 m	10.46
2015	SEA Games	Singapore	3rd	100 m	10.45
2016	World Indoor Championships	Portland, United States	31st (h)	60 m	6.77
2016	ASEAN University Games	Singapore	3rd	100 m	10.75
2016	ASEAN University Games	Singapore	2nd	4 × 100 m relay	40.52
2017	SEA Games	Kuala Lumpur, Malaysia	2nd	4 × 100 m relay	39.05

== Personal bests ==
Outdoor

- 100 metres – 10.41 (+0.7 m/s, Rumbai 2012)
- 200 metres – 21.50 (+1.0 m/s, Jakarta 2013)

Indoor

- 60 metres – 6.77 (Portland 2016)
