= Bangladesh at the 2014 Asian Beach Games =

- IOC code: BAN
- NOC: Bangladesh Olympic Association

in Phuket
- Medals: Gold 0 Silver 0 Bronze 0 Total 0

Asian Beach Games appearances
- 2008; 2010; 2012; 2014; 2016; 2026

Bangladesh participated in the 2014 Asian Beach Games in Phuket, Thailand from 14 to 23 November 2014.

Bangladesh first participated at the Asian Games at Bangkok in 1978. Their best performance was during the 2010 games in Guangzhou where they collected one gold, one silver and a bronze medal, ranking them 27th out of the 45 participating countries.

== Medal summary ==
=== Medal by sport ===
Medals by sport
Sport	1st place, gold medalist(s)	2nd place, silver medalist(s)	3rd place, bronze medalist(s)	Total
Ju-Jitsu	0	0	0	0
Sambo	0	0	0	0
Total	0	0	0	0

=== Medal by Date ===
Medals by date
Day	Date	1st place, gold medalist(s)	2nd place, silver medalist(s)	3rd place, bronze medalist(s)	Total
–1	12 Nov	0	0	0	0
0	13 Nov	0	0	0	0
1	14 Nov	0	0	0	0
2	15 Nov	0	0	0	0
3	16 Nov	0	0	0	0
4	17 Nov	0	0	0	0
5	18 Nov	0	0	0	0
6	19 Nov	0	0	0	0
7	20 Nov	0	0	0	0
8	21 Nov	0	0	0	0
9	22 Nov	0	0	0	0
10	23 Nov	0	0	0	0
Total		0	0	0	0
