= Bahrain at the 2014 Asian Beach Games =

- IOC code: BRN
- NOC: Bahrain Olympic Committee

in Phuket
- Competitors: 54 (50 men & 4 women) in 8 sports
- Medals Ranked 10th: Gold 5 Silver 2 Bronze 0 Total 7

Asian Beach Games appearances
- 2008; 2010; 2012; 2014; 2016; 2026

Bahrain participated in the 2014 Asian Beach Games in Phuket, Thailand from 14 to 23 November 2014.

== Medal summary ==
=== Medal by sport ===
Medals by sport
Sport	1st place, gold medalist(s)	2nd place, silver medalist(s)	3rd place, bronze medalist(s)	Total
Beach Athletics	4	2	0	6
Bodybuilding	1	0	0	1
Total	5	2	0	7

=== Medal by Date ===
Medals by date
Day	Date	1st place, gold medalist(s)	2nd place, silver medalist(s)	3rd place, bronze medalist(s)	Total
1	14 Nov	0	0	0	0
2	15 Nov	0	0	0	0
3	16 Nov	0	0	0	0
4	17 Nov	0	0	0	0
5	18 Nov	0	0	0	0
6	19 Nov	0	0	0	0
7	20 Nov	0	0	0	0
8	21 Nov	4	2	0	6
9	22 Nov	1	0	0	1
10	23 Nov	0	0	0	0
Total		5	2	0	7
