= Aero Sutan Aswar =

Indonesian jet skier (born 1994)

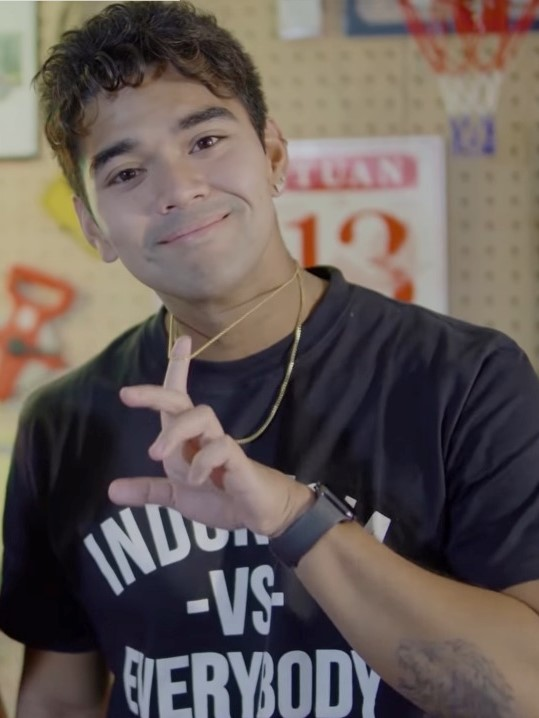
- Aero in 2019

Personal information
- Nationality: Indonesian
- Born: 4 December 1994 (age 31) Jakarta, Indonesia
- Height: 180 cm (5 ft 11 in)
- Weight: 75 kg (165 lb)

Sport
- Country: Indonesia
Medal record
Men's jet ski
Representing Indonesia
Asian Games
Silver medal – second place	2018 Jakarta–Palembang	runabout limited
Asian Beach Games
Gold medal – first place	2010 Muscat	runabout endurance open
Gold medal – first place	2014 Phuket	runabout endurance open
Silver medal – second place	2014 Phuket	runabout stock
Bronze medal – third place	2014 Phuket	runabout open
SEA Games
Gold medal – first place	2023 Cambodia	runabout endurance open
Gold medal – first place	2025 Thailand	endurance open

Aero Sutan Aswar (born 4 December 1994) is an Indonesian male jet skier. His younger brother Aqsa Sutan Aswar is also a jet skier who competes for Indonesia in international arena. He claimed a silver medal in the men's runabout limited during the 2018 Asian Games while his younger brother Aqsa Sutan Aswar also claimed a bronze medal in the relevant event.
