= Phearath Nget =

Cambodian sprinter

Personal information
- Born: 27 March 1993 (age 33)
- Education: Western University
- Height: 1.75 m (5 ft 9 in)
- Weight: 59 kg (130 lb)

Sport
- Country: Cambodia
- Sport: Athletics
- Event(s): 100 m, 200 m
- Updated on 29 August 2015

Phearath Nget (born 27 March 1993) is a Cambodian sprinter. He competed in the 200 metres at the 2015 World Championships in Beijing without advancing from the first round.

== International competitions ==
Year	Competition	Venue	Position	Event	Notes
Representing Cambodia
2015	Southeast Asian Games	Singapore	12th (h)	100 m	10.87
2015	Southeast Asian Games	Singapore	9th (h)	200 m	21.91
2015	Universiade	Gwangju, South Korea	–	100 m	DQ
2015	Universiade	Gwangju, South Korea	37th (h)	200 m	21.89
2015	World Championships	Beijing, China	51st (h)	200 m	22.11
2017	World Championships	London, United Kingdom	17th (p)	100 m	10.99

== Personal bests ==
- 100 metres – 10.87 (0.0 m/s, Singapore 2015)
- 200 metres – 21.89 (0.0 m/s, Gwangju 2015)
