= Aqsa Sutan Aswar =

Indonesian jet skier (born 1997)

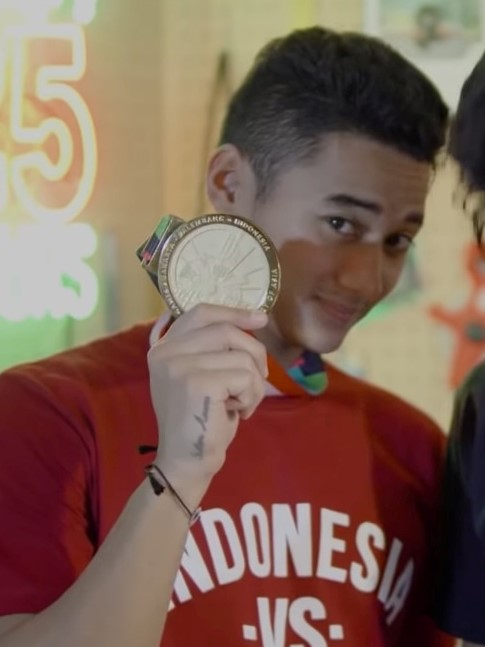
- Aqsa Sutan holding his 2018 Asian Games gold medal

Personal information
- Born: May 31, 1997 (age 29) Jakarta, Indonesia
- Height: 169 cm (5 ft 7 in)
- Weight: 60 kg (132 lb)

Sport
- Country: Indonesia
Medal record
Men's jet ski
Representing Indonesia
Asian Games
Gold medal – first place	2018 Jakarta–Palembang	runabout endurance open
Bronze medal – third place	2018 Jakarta–Palembang	runabout limited
Asian Beach Games
Gold medal – first place	2014 Phuket	runabout stock
Bronze medal – third place	2014 Phuket	runabout endurance open
SEA Games
Bronze medal – third place	2023 Cambodia	runabout endurance open
Bronze medal – third place	2023 Cambodia	runabout stock
Bronze medal – third place	2025 Thailand	runabout stock

Aqsa Sutan Aswar (born 31 May 1997) is an Indonesian male jet skier. His elder brother Aero Sutan Aswar is also a jet skier who competes for Indonesia in international arena. He claimed a bronze medal in the men's runabout limited during the 2018 Asian Games while his elder brother Aero Sutan Aswar also claimed a bronze medal in the relevant event.
