= Kuwait at the 2014 Asian Beach Games =

- IOC code: KUW
- NOC: Kuwait Olympic Committee

in Phuket
- Medals Ranked 22nd: Gold 1 Silver 4 Bronze 6 Total 11

Asian Beach Games appearances
- 2008; 2010–2012; 2014; 2016; 2026

Other related appearances
- Independent Olympic Athletes (2010, 2012, 2016)

Kuwait participates in the 2014 Asian Beach Games in Phuket, Thailand from 14 to 23 November 2014.

== Medal summary ==
=== Medal by sport ===
Medals by sport
| Sport | 1st place, gold medalist(s) | 2nd place, silver medalist(s) | 3rd place, bronze medalist(s) | Total |
|---|---|---|---|---|
| Beach Athletics | 1 | 1 | 0 | 2 |
| Beach Flag Football | 0 | 1 | 0 | 1 |
| Beach Water Polo | 0 | 0 | 1 | 1 |
| Jetski | 0 | 2 | 2 | 4 |
| Ju-Jitsu | 0 | 0 | 3 | 3 |
| Total | 1 | 4 | 6 | 11 |

=== Medal by Date ===
Medals by date
| Day | Date | 1st place, gold medalist(s) | 2nd place, silver medalist(s) | 3rd place, bronze medalist(s) | Total |
|---|---|---|---|---|---|
| –1 | 12 Nov | 0 | 0 | 2 | 2 |
| 0 | 13 Nov | 0 | 0 | 1 | 1 |
| 1 | 14 Nov | 0 | 1 | 0 | 1 |
| 2 | 15 Nov | 0 | 0 | 0 | 0 |
| 3 | 16 Nov | 0 | 0 | 0 | 0 |
| 4 | 17 Nov | 0 | 1 | 1 | 2 |
| 5 | 18 Nov | 0 | 1 | 1 | 2 |
| 6 | 19 Nov | 1 | 1 | 0 | 2 |
| 7 | 20 Nov | 0 | 0 | 0 | 0 |
| 8 | 21 Nov | 0 | 0 | 0 | 0 |
| 9 | 22 Nov | 0 | 0 | 1 | 1 |
| 10 | 23 Nov | 0 | 0 | 0 | 0 |
| Total | | 1 | 4 | 6 | 11 |
