= Philippines at the 2016 Asian Beach Games =

- IOC code: PHI
- NOC: Philippine Olympic Committee
- Website: www.olympic.ph (in English)

in Đà Nẵng
- Competitors: 65 in 11 sports
- Medals Ranked 17thth: Gold 2 Silver 4 Bronze 15 Total 21

Asian Beach Games appearances
- 2008; 2010; 2012; 2014; 2016; 2026

The Philippines competed in the 2016 Asian Beach Games in Danang, Vietnam from September 24 to October 5, 2016. The delegation was bannered by 72 athletes in 11 sports including 3-on-3 basketball, marathon swimming, beach athletics, beach kurash, beach rowing, beach sepak takraw, beach volleyball, beach wrestling, jiu-jitsu, muay thai, and pencak silat. Marestella Torres of long jump and Jessie Lacuna of swimming, who were part of the national delegation in the 2016 Summer Olympics in Rio de Janeiro, Brazil in August 2016, were included in the Philippine team. Philippine Amateur Sepak Takraw Association President Karen Tanchanco-Caballero was named as the team's chef-de-mission.

Jujutsu practitioner, Margarita Ochoa bagged the country's first gold medal of the 2016 Asian Games. Annie Ramirez, also from Jujutsu, bagged the second gold medal in the women’s -55 kg division contest. Both received an incentive of ₱500 thousand from the Philippine Sports Commission for their feat.

== Medalists ==
=== Gold ===
No.	Medal	Name	Sport	Event	Date
1	Gold	Margarita Ochoa	Ju-jitsu	Women's Ne-waza −45kg	25 Sep
2	Gold	Annie Ramirez	Ju-jitsu	Women's Ne-waza −55kg	26 Sep

=== Silver ===
No.	Medal	Name	Sport	Event	Date
1	Silver	Gian Taylor Dee	Ju-jitsu	Men's Ne-waza −62kg	25 Sep
2	Silver	Jaciren Abad	Pencak silat	Men's 55kg	1 Oct
3	Silver	Jefferson Rhey Loon	Pencak silat	Men's 65kg	1 Oct
4	Silver	Princess Lyn Enopia	Pencak silat	Women's 50kg	1 Oct

=== Bronze ===
No.	Medal	Name	Sport	Event	Date
1	Bronze	Mark Harry Diones	Beach Athletics	Men's Triple Jump	29 Sep
2	Bronze	Marestella Sunang	Beach Athletics	Women's Long Jump	26 Sep
3	Bronze	Jenina Kaila Napolis	Ju-jitsu	Women's Ne-waza −55kg	26 Sep
4	Bronze	Apryl Jessica Eppinger	Ju-jitsu	Women's Ne-waza −62kg	25 Sep
5	Bronze	Phillip Delarmino	Muay Thai	Men's Bantamweight 51–54kg	23 Sep
6	Bronze	Jonathan Polosan	Muay Thai	Men's Light welterweight 60–63.5kg	25 Sep
7	Bronze	Jay Harold Gregorio	Muay Thai	Men's Middleweight 71–75kg	25 Sep
8	Bronze	Lloyd Dennis Catipon	Beach Kurash	Men's −73kg	26 Sep
9	Bronze	Helen Dawa	Beach Kurash	Women's −52kg	25 Sep
10	Bronze	Jenielou Mosqueda	Beach Kurash	Women's −57kg	26 Sep
11	Bronze	Deseree Author; Gelyn Evora; Josefina Maat	Beach Sepak Takraw	Women's Trio	26 Sep
12	Bronze	Dines Dumaan	Pencak silat	Men's 50kg	29 Sep
13	Bronze	Rick Rod Ortega	Pencak silat	Men's 60kg	30 Sep
14	Bronze	Clyde Joy Baria	Pencak silat	Women's 60kg	30 Sep
15	Bronze	Noemi Tener	Beach Wrestling	Women's 60kg	30 Sep

== Medal summary ==
=== By sports ===
Sport	1st place, gold medalist(s)	2nd place, silver medalist(s)	3rd place, bronze medalist(s)	Total
Beach Athletics	0	0	2	2
Ju-jitsu	2	1	2	5
Beach Kurash	0	0	3	3
Muay Thai	0	0	3	3
Pencak Silat	0	3	3	6
Beach Wrestling	0	0	1	1
Beach Sepak Takraw	0	0	1	1
Total	2	4	15	21

=== By date ===
Medals by date
Day	Date	1st place, gold medalist(s)	2nd place, silver medalist(s)	3rd place, bronze medalist(s)	Total
0	23 Sep 2016	0	0	1	1
1	24 Sep 2016	Opening Ceremony			
2	25 Sep 2016	1	1	4	6
3	26 Sep 2016	1	0	5	0
4	27 Sep 2016	0	0	0	0
5	28 Sep 2016	0	0	0	0
6	29 Sep 2016	0	0	2	2
7	30 Sep 2016	0	0	3	3
8	1 Oct 2016	0	3	0	3
9	2 Oct 2016	0	0	0	0
10	3 Oct 2016	Closing Ceremony			
Total		2	4	15	21

== Beach basketball ==
=== Women's 3-on-3 basketball ===
Philippine women's national beach 3x3 team roster
Pos.	#	Players	DOB	Height
C	0	Chovi Borja	September 6, 1985	1.72 m (5 ft 7 1/2 in)
F	4	Camilla Escoto	July 4, 1993	1.73 m (5 ft 8 in)
G	7	Maria Cecilia Junsay	November 2, 1991	1.68 m (5 ft 6 in)
F	18	Sarah Mercado	September 20, 1989	1.73 m (5 ft 8 in)

Preliminary

Group A

Team	Pld	W	L	PF	PA	PD	Pts
China	4	4	0	84	24	+60	8
Turkmenistan	4	3	1	57	40	+17	6
Philippines	4	2	2	50	62	-12	4
Mongolia	4	1	3	42	55	-13	2
Laos	4	0	4	24	76	-52	0

26 September

Philippines	17–12	Laos

Danang, Vietnam

26 September

China	21–9	Philippines

Danang, Vietnam

27 September

Philippines	8–18	Turkmenistan

Danang, Vietnam

27 September

Mongolia	11–16	Philippines

Danang, Vietnam

Quarterfinal

29 September

Chinese Taipei	21–6	Philippines

Danang, Vietnam

Final rank: 6

== Ju-jitsu ==
Men

Athlete	Event	Round of 32	Round of 16	Quarterfinals	Semifinals	Finals	
Athlete	Event	Opposition Result	Opposition Result	Opposition Result	Opposition Result	Opposition	Final Ranking
Gian Dee	Newaza −62 kg	Bye	Nursulton Bozorov (TJK); W w/o	Jarrah Al-Hazza (IOC); W 99–0	Sarawut Petsing (THA); W 2–2	Amir Yahya (IRQ); L 2–4	2nd place, silver medalist(s)
Gian Dee	Open	—N/a	Muhammad Abid (PAK); L 0–9	did not advance			
Marc Lim	Newaza −69 kg	—N/a	Lê Tiến Thành (VIE); W 2–0	Andrew Canday (IND); W 99–0	Talib Al-Kirbi (THA); L 2–6	Amir Hossein Khademian (IRI); L 2–99	4
Hansel Co	Newaza −77 kg	Ali Munfaredi (BRN); L 2–99	did not advance				
Froilan Sarenas	Newaza −85 kg	Mohammad Al-Bilbaisi (JOR); L 0–3	did not advance				
Marc Lim	Newaza −94 kg	—N/a	Basel Fanous (JOR); L 0–99	did not advance			

Women

Athlete	Event	Round of 16	Quarterfinals	Semifinals	Finals	
Athlete	Event	Opposition Result	Opposition Result	Opposition Result	Opposition	Final Ranking
Margarita Ochoa	Newaza −45 kg	—N/a	Đỗ Thu Hà (VIE) 'W'99–0	Dinara Jumadurdiyeva (TKM); W 99–0	Sarawut Petsing (THA); W 99–4	1st place, gold medalist(s)
Caroline Pajaron	Newaza −45 kg	Padcharaporn Posrikaew (THA); L 2–4	did not advance			
Annie Ramirez	Newaza −55 kg	Bye	Angelina Filippova (TKM) 'W'6–0	Lea Farhat (LIB); W 99–0	Siramol Deepudsa (THA); W 10–0	1st place, gold medalist(s)
Annie Ramirez	Open	Bye	Rana Qubbaj (JOR); L 2–4	did not advance		
Kaila Napolis	Newaza −55 kg	Maryam (PAK); W 99–0	Siramol Deepudsa (THA); L 0–7	Pragya Joshi (IND); W 99–0	Lea Farhat (LIB); W 2–2	3rd place, bronze medalist(s)
Kaila Napolis	Open	Luma Qubbaj (JOR); L 0–99	did not advance			
Apryl Eppinger	Newaza −62 kg	Nguyễn Thị Thanh Thủy (VIE); W 99–0	Roudha Yaqoob (UAE); W 19–0	Ruba Al-Sayegh (JOR); L 0–99	Kashaf Javed (PAK); W 16–0	3rd place, bronze medalist(s)
Lou-Ann Jindani	Newaza −70 kg	Bhagyashree Bonde (IND); W 99–0	Caren Chammas (LIB); L 2–10	Onanong Sangsirichok (THA); L 0–99	did not advance	

== Beach kurash ==
Athlete	Event	Round of 16	Quarterfinals	Semifinals	Finals	
Athlete	Event	Opposition Result	Opposition Result	Opposition Result	Opposition	Final Ranking
Joaquin Fernandez	Men's 66 kg	—N/a	Trịnh Thanh Nhựt (VIE); L 000–112	did not advance		
Dennis Catipon	Men's 73 kg	Kunal Deswal (IND); W 013–000	Nopphasit Lertsirisombut (THA); W 001–000	Suhrob Hudoyberdiev (UZB); L 001–102	Did not advance	3rd place, bronze medalist(s)
Gilbert Ramirez	Men's 81 kg	Muhammet Temirov (TKM); L 001–101	did not advance			
Helen Dawa	Women's 52 kg	—N/a	Mahima Tokas (IND); W 001–000	Nguyễn Thị Quỳnh (VIE); L 000–102	Did not advance	3rd place, bronze medalist(s)
Jenielou Mosqueda	Women's 57 kg	—N/a	Ayna Jumakuliyeva (TKM); W 100–000	Lê Thị Tình (VIE); L 010–100	Did not advance	3rd place, bronze medalist(s)
Eunice Lucero	Women's 63 kg	Aarti (IND); W 101–002	Nguyễn Ngọc Diễm Phượng (VIE); L 000–100	did not advance		

== Pencak silat ==
=== Seni ===
Men

Athlete(s)	Event	Score	Rank
Abdulnaseef Ishmael	Tunggal	446	5
Alfau Jan Abad; Abdulnaseef Ishmael	Ganda	549	4

=== Tanding ===
Athlete	Event	Quarterfinals	Semifinals	Finals	
Athlete	Event	Opposition Result	Opposition Result	Opposition	Final Ranking
Dines Dumaan	Men's 50 kg	Bye	Nguyễn Thanh Trí (VIE); L 0–5	Did not advance	3rd place, bronze medalist(s)
Jaciren Abad	Men's 55 kg	Bye	Bo Thammavongsa (LAO); W 3–2	Vũ Văn Kiên (VIE); L 0–5	2nd place, silver medalist(s)
Rick Rod Ortega	Men's 60 kg	Amit Vinod (IND); W TKO	Nguyễn Ngọc Toàn (VIE); L 0–5	Did not advance	3rd place, bronze medalist(s)
Jeff Loon	Men's 65 kg	Bye	Nur Abdul Ghani Kamaruddin (SGP); W TKO	Pornteb Poolkaew (THA); L 0–5	2nd place, silver medalist(s)
Juanillio Ballesta	Men's 85 kg	Lê Sỹ Kiên (VIE); L 0–5	did not advance		
Princess Lyn Enopia	Women's 50 kg	Bye	Nguyễn Thị Kim (VIE); W w/o	Firdao Duromae (THA); L 0–5	2nd place, silver medalist(s)
Mutmainna Asmad	Women's 55 kg	Olathay Sounthavong (LAO); L 1–4	did not advance		
Clyde Joy Baria	Women's 60 kg	Kaewrudee Kamtakrapoom (THA); W 4–1	Siti Zubaidah Che Omar (MAS); L 0–5	Did not advance	3rd place, bronze medalist(s)

== Beach sepak takraw ==
=== Women's trio ===
Players

- Deseree Author
- Gelyn Evora
- Josefina Maat

Preliminary
Group A

Team	Pld	W	L	SF	SA	Pts
Laos	2	2	0	4	0	4
Philippines	2	1	1	2	2	2
India	2	0	2	0	4	0

Date		Score		Set 1	Set 2	Set 3
25 Sep	Laos	2–0	Philippines	21–13	22–20	
26 Sep	India	0–2	Philippines	8–21	2–21	

Knockout round

Semifinals; 26 September			Gold medal match 27 September
Laos	10	17
Myanmar	21	21	Myanmar	9	15
Vietnam	21	21	Vietnam	21	21
Philippines	11	11

Final rank: (bronze)
