= Pincky Balhara =

Indian Kurash wrestler and Judoka

Personal information
- Nationality: Indian
- Born: 20 October 1998 (age 27) Neb Sarai, Delhi
- Height: 164 cm (5 ft 5 in)
- Weight: 78 kg (172 lb)

Sport
- Country: India
- Sport: Kurash
- University team: Delhi University
Medal record
Women's Kurash
Representing India
Asian Beach Games
Bronze medal – third place	2016 La Dang	52 kg
Asian Games
Silver medal – second place	2018 Jakarta	52 kg
Bronze medal – third place	2026 Aichi-Nagoya	78 kg
- Updated on 28 September 2026

Pincky Balhara (born 1998) is an Indian Kurash wrestler and Judoka.

== Career ==
From 24 September to 3 October 2016, India competed in the 2016 Asian Beach Games. The country's first medal was won by Balhara, a bronze medal in the 52 kg wrestling (kurash) event.

At the 2018 Asian Games, in Jakarta, Balhara won a 52 kg silver medal in Kurash. She won a bronze medal in the women's 78kg kurash of the 2026 Asian Games.

She trains at WINN sports Academy in Saharanpur.
