= Iran at the 2016 Asian Beach Games =

Iran at multi-sport events

- IOC code: IRI
- NOC: National Olympic Committee of the Islamic Republic of Iran

in Da Nang
- Competitors: 33 in 9 sports
- Flag bearer: Kaveh Soleimani
- Medals Ranked 4th: Gold 9 Silver 6 Bronze 6 Total 21

Asian Beach Games appearances
- 2008; 2010; 2012; 2014; 2016; 2026

Iran competed at the 2016 Asian Beach Games held in Danang, Vietnam from 24 September to 3 October 2016. Iran finished 4th in medal table with 21 medals including nine gold medals.

== Competitors ==
| Sport | Men | Women | Total |
|---|---|---|---|
| Beach athletics | 3 | | 3 |
| Beach kurash | 3 | | 3 |
| Beach sambo | 3 | | 3 |
| Beach wrestling | 3 | | 3 |
| Ju-jitsu | 4 | | 4 |
| Muaythai | 4 | | 4 |
| Pencak silat | 4 | | 4 |
| Vocotruyen | 6 | | 6 |
| Vovinam | 3 | | 3 |
| Total | 33 | 0 | 33 |

== Medal summary ==
=== Medals by sport ===
| Sport | Gold | Silver | Bronze | Total |
|---|---|---|---|---|
| Beach athletics | 1 | 1 | 1 | 3 |
| Beach kurash | 2 | 1 | | 3 |
| Beach sambo | | 1 | 1 | 2 |
| Beach wrestling | 2 | 1 | | 3 |
| Ju-jitsu | | | 1 | 1 |
| Muaythai | 2 | | | 2 |
| Pencak silat | | 1 | 1 | 2 |
| Vocotruyen | 2 | 1 | 1 | 4 |
| Vovinam | | | 1 | 1 |
| Total | 9 | 6 | 6 | 21 |

=== Medalists ===
| Medal | Name | Sport | Event |
|---|---|---|---|
| Gold | Ali Samari | Beach athletics | Men's shot put |
| Gold | Hossein Sheikholeslami | Beach kurash | Men's 60 kg |
| Gold | Elias Aliakbari | Beach kurash | Men's 81 kg |
| Gold | Mohammad Naderi | Beach wrestling | Men's 70 kg |
| Gold | Omid Hassantabar | Beach wrestling | Men's 80 kg |
| Gold | Kaveh Soleimani | Muaythai | Men's 67 kg |
| Gold | Masoud Minaei | Muaythai | Men's 71 kg |
| Gold | Yaser Pormehr | Vocotruyen | Men's 50 kg |
| Gold | Mohsen Gholami | Vocotruyen | Men's openweight |
| Silver | Reza Ghasemi | Beach athletics | Men's 60 m |
| Silver | Ghanbar Ali Ghanbari | Beach kurash | Men's 66 kg |
| Silver | Yousef Karimian | Beach sambo | Men's 74 kg |
| Silver | Mohammad Sadati | Beach wrestling | Men's 90 kg |
| Silver | Akbar Kianian | Pencak silat | Men's tanding 70 kg |
| Silver | Hossein Yazdani | Vocotruyen | Men's 70 kg |
| Bronze | Sobhan Taherkhani | Beach athletics | Men's long jump |
| Bronze | Iraj Amirkhani | Beach sambo | Men's 90 kg |
| Bronze | Amir Hossein Khademian | Ju-jitsu | Men's ne-waza 69 kg |
| Bronze | Babak Hashemzadeh | Pencak silat | Men's tanding 85 kg |
| Bronze | Firouz Mokhtari | Vocotruyen | Men's 55 kg |
| Bronze | Meisam Jahanipour | Vovinam | Men's five gate form |

== Results by event ==
=== Beach athletics ===
| Athlete | Event | Round 1 | | Final | Rank |
| Athlete | Event | Time | Rank | Time / Result | Rank |
|---|---|---|---|---|---|
| Reza Ghasemi | Men's 60 m | 6.97 | 2 Q | 6.55 | 2nd place, silver medalist(s) |
| Sobhan Taherkhani | Men's 60 m | DNS | — | Did not advance | — |
| Sobhan Taherkhani | Men's long jump | —N/a | | 7.35 m | 3rd place, bronze medalist(s) |
| Ali Samari | Men's shot put | —N/a | | 18.29 m | 1st place, gold medalist(s) |

=== Beach kurash ===
| Athlete | Event | Round of 16 | Quarterfinal | Semifinal | Final | Rank |
|---|---|---|---|---|---|---|
| Hossein Sheikholeslami | Men's 60 kg | —N/a | Tokas (IND); W 101–000 | Võ (VIE); W 101–011 | Chinbat (MGL); W 001–001 | 1st place, gold medalist(s) |
| Ghanbar Ali Ghanbari | Men's 66 kg | Allaberdiýew (TKM); W 011–003 | Suwannawong (THA); W 101–000 | Trịnh (VIE); W 101–001 | Tukhtaev (UZB); L 002–002 | 2nd place, silver medalist(s) |
| Elias Aliakbari | Men's 81 kg | Balayan (IND); W 101–000 | Suwannaphueng (THA); W 100–000 | Abdyrahmanow (TKM); W 001–001 | Shamsidinov (UZB); W 002–001 | 1st place, gold medalist(s) |

=== Beach sambo ===
| Athlete | Event | Round of 16 | Quarterfinal | Semifinal | Final | Rank |
|---|---|---|---|---|---|---|
| Yousef Karimian | Men's 74 kg | Qaddoori (IRQ); W Activity | Trịnh (VIE); W Throw | Kudratov (UZB); W Throw | Mambetzhan Uulu (KGZ); L Throw | 2nd place, silver medalist(s) |
| Iraj Amirkhani | Men's 90 kg | Noori (AFG); W Throw | Phạm (VIE); W Throw | Yuldashev (UZB); L Throw | 3rd place match Nicolaos (LIB); W Throw | 3rd place, bronze medalist(s) |
| Behnam Hodhodi | Men's +90 kg | Gulyamov (UZB); W Throw | Issa (IRQ); W Activity | Önörjargal (MGL); L Throw | 3rd place match Fadel (LIB); L Throw | 5 |

=== Beach wrestling ===
| Athlete | Event | Round of 32 | Round of 16 | Quarterfinal | Semifinal | | Final | Rank |
|---|---|---|---|---|---|---|---|---|
| Mohammad Naderi | Men's 70 kg | —N/a | Nguon (CAM); W 3–0 | Batzorig (MGL); W 3–0 | Afzalzada (AFG); W 3–0 | | Nazir (PAK); W 3–0 | 1st place, gold medalist(s) |
| Omid Hassantabar | Men's 80 kg | —N/a | Nairisiga (CHN); W 3–0 | Ankhbayar (MGL); W 3–1 | Butt (PAK); W 3–0 | | Aunjai (THA); W 3–0 | 1st place, gold medalist(s) |
| Mohammad Sadati | Men's 90 kg | Group round Kerimkulov (KGZ); W 3–1 | Group round Khan (QAT); W 3–0 | Group round Naseri (AFG); W 3–0 | Group round Lin (CHN); W 3–0 | Rank; 1 Q | Inam (PAK); L 0–3 | 2nd place, silver medalist(s) |

=== Ju-jitsu ===
| Athlete | Event | Round of 32 | Round of 16 | Quarterfinal | Semifinal | Final | Rank |
|---|---|---|---|---|---|---|---|
| Mehran Sattar; Ahmad Reza Eidi | Men's duo show | —N/a | Taňryberdiýew and Taňryberdiýew (TKM); L 35.5–37.5 | Did not advance | | | 9 |
| Mehran Sattar | Men's ne-waza 56 kg | —N/a | Taňryberdiýew (TKM); W WO | Siddique (PAK); W WO | Erdenebaatar (MGL); L 0–12 | 3rd place match Singchalad (THA); L SUB (6–2) | 5 |
| Ahmad Reza Eidi | Men's ne-waza 62 kg | Bye | Taňryberdiýew (TKM); W 13–0 | Yahya (IRQ); L SUB (0–6) | Repechage; Bualuang (THA); W 18–0 | 3rd place match Petsing (THA); L 0–2 | 5 |
| Amir Hossein Khademian | Men's ne-waza 69 kg | —N/a | Raman (IND); W SUB (8–0) | Ahmed (IRQ); L 0–16 | Repechage; Davaadorj (MGL); W SUB (4–0) | 3rd place match Lim (PHI); W SUB (0–2) | 3rd place, bronze medalist(s) |
| Mohammad Mansouri Davar | Men's ne-waza 85 kg | Bye | Kasymow (TKM); W SUB (6–0) | Al-Bilbaisi (JOR); L 0–8 | Repechage; Murtazaliev (KGZ); L SUB (0–0) | Did not advance | 7 |
| Amir Hossein Khademian | Men's ne-waza openweight | —N/a | Al-Hammadi (UAE); L 0–3 | Did not advance | | | 9 |

=== Muaythai ===
| Athlete | Event | Round of 16 | Quarterfinal | Semifinal | Final | Rank |
|---|---|---|---|---|---|---|
| Jamal Madani | Men's 57 kg | Bayaras (PHI); W RSCB | Khamtha (THA); L 27–30 | Did not advance | | 5 |
| Mehrdad Sayyadi | Men's 60 kg | Dobrynin (KAZ); W 30–27 | Nguyễn (VIE); L 27–30 | Did not advance | | 5 |
| Kaveh Soleimani | Men's 67 kg | Bye | Tagaev (UZB); W WO | Wang (CHN); W RSCO | Kanatbayev (KAZ); W KOH | 1st place, gold medalist(s) |
| Masoud Minaei | Men's 71 kg | —N/a | Na (KOR); W RET | Shan (CHN); W RSCO | Trương (VIE); W RSCH | 1st place, gold medalist(s) |

=== Pencak silat ===
| Athlete | Event | Quarterfinal | Semifinal | Final | Rank |
|---|---|---|---|---|---|
| Akbar Kianian | Men's 70 kg | —N/a | Shekhar (IND); W RSC | Jamari (MAS); L 0–5 | 2nd place, silver medalist(s) |
| Mohsen Ranjdoust | Men's 75 kg | Rashid (SGP); L 0–5 | Did not advance | | 5 |
| Masoud Ghiasifar | Men's 80 kg | Sanjaya (INA); L DSQ | Did not advance | | 5 |
| Babak Hashemzadeh | Men's 85 kg | Bye | Alau'ddin (SGP); L 0–5 | Did not advance | 3rd place, bronze medalist(s) |

=== Vocotruyen ===
| Athlete | Event | Quarterfinal | Semifinal | Final | Rank |
|---|---|---|---|---|---|
| Yaser Pormehr | Men's 50 kg | Bye | Jadhav (IND); W KO | Đặng (VIE); W DSQ | 1st place, gold medalist(s) |
| Firouz Mokhtari | Men's 55 kg | Bye | Phommakhamthong (LAO); L 0–2 | Did not advance | 3rd place, bronze medalist(s) |
| Mohammad Salehi | Men's 60 kg | Soukaphone (LAO); L 0–2 | Did not advance | | 5 |
| Ali Aghajari | Men's 65 kg | Latsaphao (LAO); L 0–2 | Did not advance | | 5 |
| Hossein Yazdani | Men's 70 kg | Oeun (CAM); W 2–0 | Garad (IND); W RSC | Nguyễn (VIE); L 1–2 | 2nd place, silver medalist(s) |
| Mohsen Gholami | Men's openweight | Has (CAM); W 2–0 | Chavan (IND); W RSC | Trần (VIE); W KO | 1st place, gold medalist(s) |

=== Vovinam ===
| Athlete | Event | Score | Rank |
|---|---|---|---|
| Meisam Jahanipour | Men's five gate form | 260 | 3rd place, bronze medalist(s) |
| Saeid Ahmadi; Mehdi Amirifar | Men's dual machete form | 255 | 5 |
