= Gong Byung-min =

South Korean freestyle wrestler

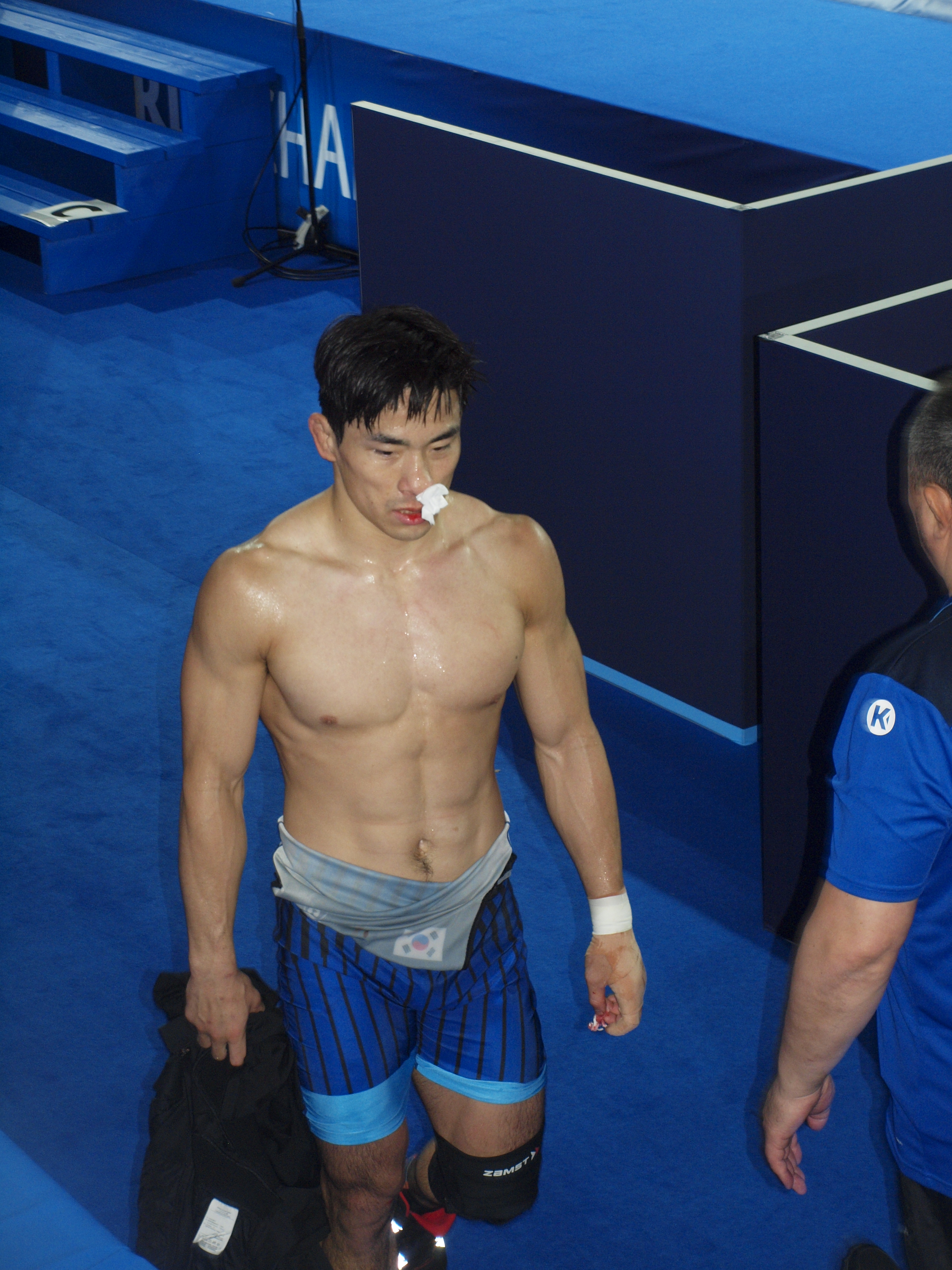
- Gong Byung-min at the 2021 World Wrestling Championships in Oslo, Norway

Personal information
- Born: 4 July 1991 (age 35)
- Height: 173 cm (5 ft 8 in)

Sport
- Country: South Korea
- Sport: Amateur wrestling
- Event: Freestyle
Medal record
Men's freestyle wrestling
Representing South Korea
Asian Games
Bronze medal – third place	2018 Jakarta	74 kg
Asian Championships
Gold medal – first place	2021 Almaty	79 kg
Men's beach wrestling
Representing South Korea
Asian Beach Games
Bronze medal – third place	2016 Da Nang	80 kg

Gong Byung-min (born 4 July 1991) is a South Korean freestyle wrestler. He represented South Korea at the 2018 Asian Games held in Indonesia and he won one of the bronze medals in the men's 74 kg event.

Gong competed at the 2024 Asian Wrestling Olympic Qualification Tournament in Bishkek, Kyrgyzstan hoping to qualify for the 2024 Summer Olympics in Paris, France. He was eliminated in his second match and he did not qualify for the Olympics. Gong also competed at the 2024 World Wrestling Olympic Qualification Tournament held in Istanbul, Turkey without qualifying for the Olympics.

== Achievements ==
Year	Tournament	Location	Result	Event
2016	Asian Beach Games	Da Nang, Vietnam	3rd	Beach wrestling 80 kg
2018	Asian Games	Jakarta, Indonesia	3rd	Freestyle 74 kg
2021	Asian Championships	Almaty, Kazakhstan	1st	Freestyle 79 kg
