= Pencak silat at the 2016 Asian Beach Games =

- Venue: Biển Đông Park
- Dates: 27 September – 1 October 2016

Pencak silat competition at the 2016 Asian Beach Games was held in Danang, Vietnam from 27 September to 1 October 2016 at Bien Dong park, Danang, Vietnam.

== Medalists ==
=== Men's seni ===
Event	Gold	Silver	Bronze
Tunggal	Ilyas Sadara; Thailand	Dino Bima Sulistianto; Indonesia	Iqbal Abdul Rahman; Singapore
Ganda	Malaysia; Taqiyuddin Hamid; Rosli Sharif	Indonesia; Haidir Agung Falatehan; Dede Setiadi	Thailand; Adisak Jehna; Beela Nawae
Regu	Vietnam; Nguyễn Xuân Thành; Vũ Quốc Việt; Vũ Tiến Dũng	Vietnam; Lê Hồng Quân; Lưu Văn Nam; Trần Đức Danh	Laos; Souksavanh Chanthilath; Thanaphonh Simphilavong; Bo Thammavongsa

=== Men's tanding ===
Event	Gold	Silver	Bronze
Class A 45–50 kg	Nguyễn Thành Trí; Vietnam	Sabidee Salaeh; Thailand	Thanaphonh Simphilavong; Laos
Class A 45–50 kg	Nguyễn Thành Trí; Vietnam	Sabidee Salaeh; Thailand	Dines Dumaan; Philippines
Class B 50–55 kg	Vũ Văn Kiên; Vietnam	Jaciren Abad; Philippines	Nanthachai Khansakhon; Thailand
Class B 50–55 kg	Vũ Văn Kiên; Vietnam	Jaciren Abad; Philippines	Bo Thammavongsa; Laos
Class C 55–60 kg	Nguyễn Ngọc Toàn; Vietnam	Zarish Hakim; Malaysia	Denny Aprisani; Indonesia
Class C 55–60 kg	Nguyễn Ngọc Toàn; Vietnam	Zarish Hakim; Malaysia	Rick Rod Ortega; Philippines
Class D 60–65 kg	Pornteb Poolkaew; Thailand	Jeff Loon; Philippines	Nur Abdul Ghani Kamaruddin; Singapore
Class D 60–65 kg	Pornteb Poolkaew; Thailand	Jeff Loon; Philippines	Sanjay Kumar; India
Class E 65–70 kg	Al-Jufferi Jamari; Malaysia	Akbar Kianian; Iran	Chandra Shekhar; India
Class E 65–70 kg	Al-Jufferi Jamari; Malaysia	Akbar Kianian; Iran	Kuibrohem Kubaha; Thailand
Class F 70–75 kg	Trần Đình Nam; Vietnam	Fauzi Khalid; Malaysia	Kuldeep Singh Mokawat; India
Class F 70–75 kg	Trần Đình Nam; Vietnam	Fauzi Khalid; Malaysia	Raaziq Rashid; Singapore
Class G 75–80 kg	Nguyễn Duy Tuyến; Vietnam	Alan Sanjaya; Indonesia	Manoj Sai Purimitla; India
Class G 75–80 kg	Nguyễn Duy Tuyến; Vietnam	Alan Sanjaya; Indonesia	Nur Alfian Juma'en; Singapore
Class H 80–85 kg	Sheik Farhan Alau'ddin; Singapore	Lê Sỹ Kiên; Vietnam	Babak Hashemzadeh; Iran
Class H 80–85 kg	Sheik Farhan Alau'ddin; Singapore	Lê Sỹ Kiên; Vietnam	Amber Singh Bhardwaj; India

=== Women's seni ===
Event	Gold	Silver	Bronze
Tunggal	Nurul Khairunnisa Azlani; Singapore	Nguyễn Thị Thúy; Vietnam	Nur Atikah Alias; Malaysia
Ganda	Vietnam; Dương Thị Ánh Nguyệt; Nguyễn Thị Thu Hà	Malaysia; Nur Syazreen Abdul Malik; Nor Hamizah Abu Hassan	Vietnam; Nguyễn Thị Huyền; Phạm Hoàng Thi Phương
Regu	Vietnam; Dương Thị Ánh Nguyệt; Nguyễn Thị Thúy; Nguyễn Thị Thu Hà	Singapore; Nur Azlyana Ismail; Nurzuhairah Yazid; Nurhanishah Shahrudin	Thailand; Salini Mamu; Supaphon Simthiam; Pimchanok Yingyam

=== Women's tanding ===
Event	Gold	Silver	Bronze
Class A 45–50 kg	Firdao Duromae; Thailand	Princesslyn Enopia; Philippines	Manilattana Sayasane; Laos
Class A 45–50 kg	Firdao Duromae; Thailand	Princesslyn Enopia; Philippines	Nguyễn Thị Kim; Vietnam
Class B 50–55 kg	Suda Lueangaphichatkun; Thailand	Đào Thị Tuyết; Vietnam	Nurul Shafiqah Saiful; Singapore
Class B 50–55 kg	Suda Lueangaphichatkun; Thailand	Đào Thị Tuyết; Vietnam	Olathay Sounthavong; Laos
Class C 55–60 kg	Siti Zubaidah Che Omar; Malaysia	Nurhanishah Shahrudin; Singapore	Clyde Joy Baria; Philippines
Class C 55–60 kg	Siti Zubaidah Che Omar; Malaysia	Nurhanishah Shahrudin; Singapore	Fransiska Sandra Dewi; Indonesia
Class D 60–65 kg	Cà Thị Mai; Vietnam	Nurul Ain Sohrab; Malaysia	Nurul Suhaila; Singapore
Class D 60–65 kg	Cà Thị Mai; Vietnam	Nurul Ain Sohrab; Malaysia	Riya Ravi Iyer; India

== Medal table ==
Rank	Nation	Gold	Silver	Bronze	Total
1	Vietnam (VIE)	9	4	2	15
2	Thailand (THA)	4	1	4	9
3	Malaysia (MAS)	3	4	1	8
4	Singapore (SGP)	2	2	6	10
5	Philippines (PHI)	0	3	3	6
6	Indonesia (INA)	0	3	2	5
7	Iran (IRI)	0	1	1	2
8	India (IND)	0	0	6	6
9	Laos (LAO)	0	0	5	5
Totals (9 entries)		18	18	30	66

== Results ==
=== Men's seni ===
==== Tunggal ====
27 September

Rank	Athlete	Score
1st place, gold medalist(s)	Ilyas Sadara (THA)	467
2nd place, silver medalist(s)	Dino Bima Sulistianto (INA)	463
3rd place, bronze medalist(s)	Iqbal Abdul Rahman (SGP)	460
4	Souksavanh Chanthilath (LAO)	459
5	Abdulnaseef Ishmael (PHI)	446
6	Anuj Dattaguru Sarnaik (IND)	421

==== Ganda ====
27 September

Rank	Team	Score
1st place, gold medalist(s)	Malaysia (MAS); Taqiyuddin Hamid; Rosli Sharif	571
2nd place, silver medalist(s)	Indonesia (INA); Haidir Agung Falatehan; Dede Setiadi	561
3rd place, bronze medalist(s)	Thailand (THA); Adisak Jehna; Beela Nawae	557
4	Philippines (PHI); Alfau Jan Abad; Abdulnaseef Ishmael	549

==== Regu ====
28 September

Rank	Team	Score
1st place, gold medalist(s)	Vietnam (VIE)	463
2nd place, silver medalist(s)	Vietnam (VIE)	456
3rd place, bronze medalist(s)	Laos (LAO)	423

=== Men's tanding ===
==== 50 kg ====
Quarterfinals; 28 September
Iradath Putra Sanjaya (INA)	0
Nguyễn Thành Trí (VIE)	5

Semifinals; 29 September
Sabidee Salaeh (THA)	DQ
Thanaphonh Simphilavong (LAO)
Dines Dumaan (PHI)	0
Nguyễn Thành Trí (VIE)	5

Gold medal 1 October
Sabidee Salaeh (THA)	1
Nguyễn Thành Trí (VIE)	4

==== 55 kg ====
Quarterfinals; 29 September
Faizul Nasir (MAS)
Nanthachai Khansakhon (THA)	TKO
Hamillatu Arash Juffrie (SGP)	0
Bo Thammavongsa (LAO)	5

Semifinals; 30 September
Nanthachai Khansakhon (THA)	0
Vũ Văn Kiên (VIE)	5
Jaciren Abad (PHI)	3
Bo Thammavongsa (LAO)	2

Gold medal 1 October
Vũ Văn Kiên (VIE)	5
Jaciren Abad (PHI)	0

==== 60 kg ====
Quarterfinals; 29 September		Semifinals; 30 September		Gold medal 1 October
Zarish Hakim (MAS)	5
Haziq Zainal Abidin (SGP)	0	Zarish Hakim (MAS)	5
Denny Aprisani (INA)	4	Denny Aprisani (INA)	0
Supphakin Lotkham (THA)	1			Zarish Hakim (MAS)	0
Amit Vinod (IND)				Nguyễn Ngọc Toàn (VIE)	5
Rick Rod Ortega (PHI)	TKO	Rick Rod Ortega (PHI)	0
Mino Vongphakdy (LAO)	0	Nguyễn Ngọc Toàn (VIE)	5
Nguyễn Ngọc Toàn (VIE)	5

==== 65 kg ====
Quarterfinals; 29 September
Razak Ghazali (MAS)
Pornteb Poolkaew (THA)	TKO

Semifinals; 30 September
Jeff Loon (PHI)	TKO
Nur Abdul Ghani Kamaruddin (SGP)
Sanjay Kumar (IND)	0
Pornteb Poolkaew (THA)	5

Gold medal 1 October
Jeff Loon (PHI)	0
Pornteb Poolkaew (THA)	5

==== 70 kg ====
Semifinals; 30 September		Gold medal 1 October
Akbar Kianian (IRI)	RSC
Chandra Shekhar (IND)		Akbar Kianian (IRI)	0
Al-Jufferi Jamari (MAS)	5	Al-Jufferi Jamari (MAS)	5
Kuibrohem Kubaha (THA)	0

==== 75 kg ====
Quarterfinals; 29 September
Warut Baekhunthod (THA)
Fauzi Khalid (MAS)	DQ
Mohsen Ranjdoust (IRI)	0
Raaziq Rashid (SGP)	5

Semifinals; 30 September
Fauzi Khalid (MAS)	RSC
Kuldeep Singh Mokawat (IND)
Trần Đình Nam (VIE)	5
Raaziq Rashid (SGP)	0

Gold medal 1 October
Fauzi Khalid (MAS)	0
Trần Đình Nam (VIE)	5

==== 80 kg ====
Quarterfinals; 29 September
Masoud Ghiasifar (IRI)
Alan Sanjaya (INA)	DQ
Hamizan Sadiy Shaari (MAS)	0
Nguyễn Duy Tuyến (VIE)	5

Semifinals; 30 September
Alan Sanjaya (INA)	RSC
Manoj Sai Purimitla (IND)
Nur Alfian Juma'en (SGP)
Nguyễn Duy Tuyến (VIE)	WO

Gold medal 1 October
Alan Sanjaya (INA)
Nguyễn Duy Tuyến (VIE)	RSC

==== 85 kg ====
Quarterfinals; 29 September
Sheik Farhan Alau'ddin (SGP)	5
Muslim Ilyas (INA)	0
Juanillio Ballesta (PHI)	0
Lê Sỹ Kiên (VIE)	5

Semifinals; 30 September
Sheik Farhan Alau'ddin (SGP)	5
Babak Hashemzadeh (IRI)	0
Amber Singh Bhardwaj (IND)	0
Lê Sỹ Kiên (VIE)	5

Gold medal 1 October
Sheik Farhan Alau'ddin (SGP)	3
Lê Sỹ Kiên (VIE)	2

=== Women's seni ===
==== Tunggal ====
27 September

Rank	Athlete	Score
1st place, gold medalist(s)	Nurul Khairunnisa Azlani (SGP)	462
2nd place, silver medalist(s)	Nguyễn Thị Thúy (VIE)	454
3rd place, bronze medalist(s)	Nur Atikah Alias (MAS)	445
4	Riya Ravi Iyer (IND)	390

==== Ganda ====
27 September

Rank	Team	Score
1st place, gold medalist(s)	Vietnam (VIE); Dương Thị Ánh Nguyệt; Nguyễn Thị Thu Hà	576
2nd place, silver medalist(s)	Malaysia (MAS); Nur Syazreen Abdul Malik; Nor Hamizah Abu Hassan	567
3rd place, bronze medalist(s)	Vietnam (VIE); Nguyễn Thị Huyền; Phạm Hoàng Thi Phương	548

==== Regu ====
28 September

Rank	Team	Score
1st place, gold medalist(s)	Vietnam (VIE)	467
2nd place, silver medalist(s)	Singapore (SGP)	457
3rd place, bronze medalist(s)	Thailand (THA)	452

=== Women's tanding ===
==== 50 kg ====
Quarterfinals; 28 September
Manilattana Sayasane (LAO)	5
Simran (IND)	0
Qoniath Listianingsih (INA)	0
Nguyễn Thị Kim (VIE)	5

Semifinals; 29 September
Manilattana Sayasane (LAO)	0
Firdao Duromae (THA)	5
Princesslyn Enopia (PHI)	DQ
Nguyễn Thị Kim (VIE)

Gold medal 1 October
Firdao Duromae (THA)	5
Princesslyn Enopia (PHI)	0

==== 55 kg ====
Quarterfinals; 28 September
Dela Kusumawati (INA)	0
Nurul Shafiqah Saiful (SGP)	5
Đào Thị Tuyết (VIE)	3
Siti Humairah Kasidin (MAS)	2
Mutmainna Asmad (PHI)	1
Olathay Sounthavong (LAO)	4

Semifinals; 30 September
Nurul Shafiqah Saiful (SGP)	0
Đào Thị Tuyết (VIE)	5
Suda Lueangaphichatkun (THA)	4
Olathay Sounthavong (LAO)	1

Gold medal 1 October
Đào Thị Tuyết (VIE)	1
Suda Lueangaphichatkun (THA)	4

==== 60 kg ====
Quarterfinals; 29 September
Clyde Joy Baria (PHI)	4
Kaewrudee Kamtakrapoom (THA)	1
Monika Padhi (IND)	0
Nurhanishah Shahrudin (SGP)	5

Semifinals; 30 September
Clyde Joy Baria (PHI)	0
Siti Zubaidah Che Omar (MAS)	5
Fransiska Sandra Dewi (INA)	1
Nurhanishah Shahrudin (SGP)	4

Gold medal 1 October
Siti Zubaidah Che Omar (MAS)	5
Nurhanishah Shahrudin (SGP)	0

==== 65 kg ====
Semifinals; 30 September		Gold medal 1 October
Nurul Suhaila (SGP)	2
Nurul Ain Sohrab (MAS)	3	Nurul Ain Sohrab (MAS)	1
Riya Ravi Iyer (IND)		Cà Thị Mai (VIE)	4
Cà Thị Mai (VIE)	RSC
