= Beach sambo at the 2016 Asian Beach Games =

Sambo competitions

- Venue: Biển Đông Park
- Dates: 30 September – 2 October 2016

Beach Sambo competition at the 2016 Asian Beach Games was held in Da Nang, Vietnam from 30 September to 2 October 2016 at Bien Dong Park.

Beach Sambo fights were held only in the standing position in three minutes. Victory was awarded after a throw when the opponent as a result of conducting active action falls on the sand on any part of the body other than the feet.

== Medalists ==
=== Men ===
Event	Gold	Silver	Bronze
62 kg	Begli Meretgeldiýew; Turkmenistan	Huỳnh Nhất Thống; Vietnam	Artur Te; Kyrgyzstan
62 kg	Begli Meretgeldiýew; Turkmenistan	Huỳnh Nhất Thống; Vietnam	Shuaib Yuosuf; Afghanistan
74 kg	Urmat Mambetzhan Uulu; Kyrgyzstan	Yousef Karimian; Iran	Takehiro Yamashita; Japan
74 kg	Urmat Mambetzhan Uulu; Kyrgyzstan	Yousef Karimian; Iran	Istam Kudratov; Uzbekistan
90 kg	Ilkhomjon Yuldashev; Uzbekistan	Alibek Zekenov; Kazakhstan	Son Jong-hyun; South Korea
90 kg	Ilkhomjon Yuldashev; Uzbekistan	Alibek Zekenov; Kazakhstan	Iraj Amirkhani; Iran
+90 kg	Boldpüreviin Önörjargal; Mongolia	Nuraly Ýalkapow; Turkmenistan	Jad Fadel; Lebanon
+90 kg	Boldpüreviin Önörjargal; Mongolia	Nuraly Ýalkapow; Turkmenistan	Mohammad Arif Malikyar; Afghanistan

=== Women ===
Event	Gold	Silver	Bronze
56 kg	Baatarsaikhany Solongo; Mongolia	Nguyễn Thị Ngọc Hân; Vietnam	Dinara Rozykulowa; Turkmenistan
56 kg	Baatarsaikhany Solongo; Mongolia	Nguyễn Thị Ngọc Hân; Vietnam	Malikabonu Mirzaeva; Uzbekistan
64 kg	Mönkhbatyn Davaasüren; Mongolia	Titapa Junsookplung; Thailand	Battsogtyn Buyandelger; Mongolia
64 kg	Mönkhbatyn Davaasüren; Mongolia	Titapa Junsookplung; Thailand	Nguyễn Thị Lan; Vietnam
72 kg	Tsogt-Ochiryn Battsetseg; Mongolia	Zere Bektaskyzy; Kazakhstan	Sabah Al-Khedr; Syria
72 kg	Tsogt-Ochiryn Battsetseg; Mongolia	Zere Bektaskyzy; Kazakhstan	Supattra Nanong; Thailand
+72 kg	Nguyễn Thị Như Ý Vietnam	Haruka Murase; Japan	Saneayim Erkinbaeva; Uzbekistan
+72 kg	Nguyễn Thị Như Ý Vietnam	Haruka Murase; Japan	Hà Thị Nga; Vietnam

== Medal table ==
Rank	Nation	Gold	Silver	Bronze	Total
1	Mongolia (MGL)	4	0	1	5
2	Vietnam (VIE)	1	2	2	5
3	Turkmenistan (TKM)	1	1	1	3
4	Uzbekistan (UZB)	1	0	3	4
5	Kyrgyzstan (KGZ)	1	0	1	2
6	Kazakhstan (KAZ)	0	2	0	2
7	Iran (IRI)	0	1	1	2
7	Japan (JPN)	0	1	1	2
7	Thailand (THA)	0	1	1	2
10	Afghanistan (AFG)	0	0	2	2
11	Lebanon (LIB)	0	0	1	1
11	South Korea (KOR)	0	0	1	1
11	Syria (SYR)	0	0	1	1
Totals (13 entries)		8	8	16	32

== Results ==
=== Men ===
==== 62 kg ====
30 September

Round of 32
Huỳnh Nhất Thống (VIE)	TH	Munir Ghusn (SYR)
Navdeep Aggarwal (IND)	TH	Himprawa Khattri (NEP)
Ghady Moussa (LIB)	TH	Roshan Madusanka (SRI)
Oh Hyup-chan (KOR)	TH	Begli Meretgeldiýew (TKM)

Round of 16
Huỳnh Nhất Thống (VIE)	TH
Takahito Nakamura (JPN)
Artur Te (KGZ)	TH
Kerim Allanurow (TKM)
Himprawa Khattri (NEP)
Otgony Chinbat (MGL)	TH
Pongthep Tumrongluk (THA)
Darkhan Serzhanov (KAZ)	TH
Ghady Moussa (LIB)
Trần Nhật Anh (VIE)	TH
Mohammed Hadi (IRQ)
Shuaib Yuosuf (AFG)	TH
Begli Meretgeldiýew (TKM)	TH
Arthit Khuansathan (THA)
Swapnil Lalit Brave (IND)	TH
Krishna Lal Tamang (NEP)

Quarterfinals
Huỳnh Nhất Thống (VIE)	TH
Artur Te (KGZ)
Otgony Chinbat (MGL)
Darkhan Serzhanov (KAZ)	TH
Trần Nhật Anh (VIE)
Shuaib Yuosuf (AFG)	TH
Begli Meretgeldiýew (TKM)	TH
Swapnil Lalit Brave (IND)

Semifinals
Huỳnh Nhất Thống (VIE)	TH
Darkhan Serzhanov (KAZ)
Shuaib Yuosuf (AFG)
Begli Meretgeldiýew (TKM)	TH

Final
Huỳnh Nhất Thống (VIE)	0
Begli Meretgeldiýew (TKM)	0

Repechage round 1
Munir Ghusn (SYR)
Takahito Nakamura (JPN)	TH
Oh Hyup-chan (KOR)	TH
Arthit Khuansathan (THA)

Final of repechage
Takahito Nakamura (JPN)
Artur Te (KGZ)	TH
Oh Hyup-chan (KOR)	TH
Swapnil Lalit Brave (IND)

Bronze medal finals
Artur Te (KGZ)	0
Darkhan Serzhanov (KAZ)	0
Oh Hyup-chan (KOR)
Shuaib Yuosuf (AFG)	TH

==== 74 kg ====
1 October

Round of 16
Thiti Kumpapan (THA)
Abdassalam Hag Kadour (SYR)	TH
Hà Quốc Chiến (VIE)	TH
Rohit Nityanand Nair (IND)
Takehiro Yamashita (JPN)	TH
Sadiqullah Nemat (AFG)
Urmat Mambetzhan Uulu (KGZ)	TH
Döwletgeldi Tejenow (TKM)
Mansoorbik Tajbik (AFG)	0
Trịnh Văn Sử (VIE)	0
Yousef Karimian (IRI)	0
Jasim Qaddoori (IRQ)	0
Batmönkhiin Enkhbat (MGL)
Istam Kudratov (UZB)	TH

Quarterfinals
Abdassalam Hag Kadour (SYR)	0
Hà Quốc Chiến (VIE)	0
Takehiro Yamashita (JPN)
Urmat Mambetzhan Uulu (KGZ)	TH
Trịnh Văn Sử (VIE)
Yousef Karimian (IRI)	TH
Istam Kudratov (UZB)	TH
Chanin Srichom (THA)

Semifinals
Abdassalam Hag Kadour (SYR)
Urmat Mambetzhan Uulu (KGZ)	TH
Yousef Karimian (IRI)	TH
Istam Kudratov (UZB)

Final
Urmat Mambetzhan Uulu (KGZ)	TH
Yousef Karimian (IRI)

Final of repechage
Döwletgeldi Tejenow (TKM)
Takehiro Yamashita (JPN)	TH
Jasim Qaddoori (IRQ)	TH
Trịnh Văn Sử (VIE)

Bronze medal finals
Takehiro Yamashita (JPN)	TH
Abdassalam Hag Kadour (SYR)
Jasim Qaddoori (IRQ)
Istam Kudratov (UZB)	TH

==== 90 kg ====
30 September

Round of 16
Elie El-Chaer (LIB)
Son Jong-hyun (KOR)	TH
Yoshiyuki Kikuchi (JPN)
Fahim Nadi (AFG)	TH
Digvijay Sawant (IND)
Alibek Zekenov (KAZ)	TH
Huỳnh Thanh Duy (VIE)
Kittipong Hantratin (THA)	TH
Koo Tae-hyun (KOR)
Phạm Thanh Tin (VIE)	TH
Iraj Amirkhani (IRI)	TH
Fazel Manan Noori (AFG)
Ilkhomjon Yuldashev (UZB)	TH
Kevin Nicolaos (LIB)
Sonram Jenghor (THA)	TH
Lalit Narain (IND)

Quarterfinals
Son Jong-hyun (KOR)	TH
Fahim Nadi (AFG)
Alibek Zekenov (KAZ)	TH
Kittipong Hantratin (THA)
Phạm Thanh Tin (VIE)
Iraj Amirkhani (IRI)	TH
Ilkhomjon Yuldashev (UZB)	TH
Sonram Jenghor (THA)

Semifinals
Son Jong-hyun (KOR)
Alibek Zekenov (KAZ)	TH
Iraj Amirkhani (IRI)
Ilkhomjon Yuldashev (UZB)	TH

Final
Alibek Zekenov (KAZ)
Ilkhomjon Yuldashev (UZB)	TH

Final of repechage
Digvijay Sawant (IND)
Kittipong Hantratin (THA)	TH
Kevin Nicolaos (LIB)	TH
Sonram Jenghor (THA)

Bronze medal finals
Kittipong Hantratin (THA)
Son Jong-hyun (KOR)	TH
Kevin Nicolaos (LIB)
Iraj Amirkhani (IRI)	TH

==== +90 kg ====
2 October

Round of 16
Behnam Hodhodi (IRI)	TH
Eldor Gulyamov (UZB)
Alaa Issa (IRQ)	0
Chantawat Prothien (THA)	0
Boldpüreviin Önörjargal (MGL)	TH
Lý Huỳnh Long (VIE)
Saimullah Mahdawi (AFG)	0
Jad Fadel (LIB)	0
Lê Đình Văn (VIE)	0
Katana Nishimura (JPN)	0
Nattawut Wuttipong (THA)
Nuraly Ýalkapow (TKM)	TH
Mohammad Arif Malikyar (AFG)	TH
Fenil Daxesh Gandhi (IND)

Quarterfinals
Behnam Hodhodi (IRI)	0
Alaa Issa (IRQ)	0
Boldpüreviin Önörjargal (MGL)	TH
Jad Fadel (LIB)
Lê Đình Văn (VIE)
Nuraly Ýalkapow (TKM)	TH
Mohammad Arif Malikyar (AFG)	TH
Krishan Priyadarshana (SRI)

Semifinals
Behnam Hodhodi (IRI)
Boldpüreviin Önörjargal (MGL)	TH
Nuraly Ýalkapow (TKM)	TH
Mohammad Arif Malikyar (AFG)

Final
Boldpüreviin Önörjargal (MGL)	TH
Nuraly Ýalkapow (TKM)

Final of repechage
Lý Huỳnh Long (VIE)
Jad Fadel (LIB)	TH
Nattawut Wuttipong (THA)	TH
Lê Đình Văn (VIE)

Bronze medal finals
Jad Fadel (LIB)	TH
Behnam Hodhodi (IRI)
Nattawut Wuttipong (THA)
Mohammad Arif Malikyar (AFG)	TH

=== Women ===
==== 56 kg ====
30 September

Round of 16
Lee Young-ju (KOR)
Baatarsaikhany Solongo (MGL)	TH
Lin Yizhuo (CHN)
Dinara Rozykulowa (TKM)	TH
Malikabonu Mirzaeva (UZB)	TH
Hurma Abdyýewa (TKM)
Nguyễn Thị Ngọc Hân (VIE)	0
Sasipilai Chaisang (THA)	0

Quarterfinals
Baatarsaikhany Solongo (MGL)	TH
Nguyễn Huỳnh Minh Châu (VIE)
Dinara Rozykulowa (TKM)	TH
Pigulkaew Konngoen (THA)
Malikabonu Mirzaeva (UZB)	TH
Lea Farhat (LIB)
Nguyễn Thị Ngọc Hân (VIE)	TH
Pathirana Arachchilage (SRI)

Semifinals
Baatarsaikhany Solongo (MGL)	TH
Dinara Rozykulowa (TKM)
Malikabonu Mirzaeva (UZB)
Nguyễn Thị Ngọc Hân (VIE)	TH

Final
Baatarsaikhany Solongo (MGL)	TH
Nguyễn Thị Ngọc Hân (VIE)

Final of repechage
Lee Young-ju (KOR)
Nguyễn Huỳnh Minh Châu (VIE)	TH
Sasipilai Chaisang (THA)	TH
Pathirana Arachchilage (SRI)

Bronze medal finals
Nguyễn Huỳnh Minh Châu (VIE)
Dinara Rozykulowa (TKM)	TH
Sasipilai Chaisang (THA)
Malikabonu Mirzaeva (UZB)	TH

==== 64 kg ====
1 October

Round of 16
Titapa Junsookplung (THA)	TH
Hanadi Al-Hamwi (SYR)
Zyba Orunowa (TKM)
Vương Võ Kim Thanh (VIE)	TH
Mönkhbatyn Davaasüren (MGL)	TH
Anongnat Thammaphorn (THA)
Asmila Chhantyal (NEP)
Irina Kulakova (UZB)	TH

Quarterfinals
Titapa Junsookplung (THA)	TH
Wasana Sandamali (SRI)
Vương Võ Kim Thanh (VIE)
Battsogtyn Buyandelger (MGL)	TH
Mönkhbatyn Davaasüren (MGL)	0
Qi Jingjing (CHN)	0
Irina Kulakova (UZB)	0
Nguyễn Thị Lan (VIE)	0

Semifinals
Titapa Junsookplung (THA)	TH
Battsogtyn Buyandelger (MGL)
Mönkhbatyn Davaasüren (MGL)	0
Nguyễn Thị Lan (VIE)	0

Final
Titapa Junsookplung (THA)
Mönkhbatyn Davaasüren (MGL)	TH

Final of repechage
Hanadi Al-Hamwi (SYR)
Wasana Sandamali (SRI)	TH
Anongnat Thammaphorn (THA)
Qi Jingjing (CHN)	TH

Bronze medal finals
Wasana Sandamali (SRI)
Battsogtyn Buyandelger (MGL)	TH
Qi Jingjing (CHN)
Nguyễn Thị Lan (VIE)	TH

==== 72 kg ====
1 October

Round of 16
Tsogt-Ochiryn Battsetseg (MGL)	TH
Trần Thảo Nhi (VIE)

Quarterfinals
Tsogt-Ochiryn Battsetseg (MGL)	TH
Sabah Al-Khedr (SYR)
Lee Sae-jin (KOR)
Chatthayaporn Prawiset (THA)	TH
Supattra Nanong (THA)
Zere Bektaskyzy (KAZ)	TH
Trần Thúy Duy (VIE)	TH
Caren Chammas (LIB)

Semifinals
Tsogt-Ochiryn Battsetseg (MGL)	TH
Chatthayaporn Prawiset (THA)
Zere Bektaskyzy (KAZ)	TH
Trần Thúy Duy (VIE)

Final
Tsogt-Ochiryn Battsetseg (MGL)	TH
Zere Bektaskyzy (KAZ)

Final of repechage
Trần Thảo Nhi (VIE)
Sabah Al-Khedr (SYR)	TH

Bronze medal finals
Sabah Al-Khedr (SYR)	0
Chatthayaporn Prawiset (THA)	0
Supattra Nanong (THA)	TH
Trần Thúy Duy (VIE)

==== +72 kg ====
2 October

Quarterfinals
Saneayim Erkinbaeva (UZB)	TH
Sirinapa Chaengpracham (THA)
Kymbat Turshabek (KAZ)
Nguyễn Thị Như Ý (VIE)	TH
Aýsoltan Garçowowa (TKM)
Hà Thị Nga (VIE)	TH
Patamarach Jabtake (THA)
Haruka Murase (JPN)	TH

Semifinals
Saneayim Erkinbaeva (UZB)	0
Nguyễn Thị Như Ý (VIE)	0
Hà Thị Nga (VIE)
Haruka Murase (JPN)	TH

Final
Nguyễn Thị Như Ý (VIE)	TH
Haruka Murase (JPN)

Bronze medal finals
Kymbat Turshabek (KAZ)
Saneayim Erkinbaeva (UZB)	TH
Patamarach Jabtake (THA)
Hà Thị Nga (VIE)	TH
