= Beach kurash at the 2016 Asian Beach Games =

- Venue: Biển Đông Park
- Dates: 25–27 September 2016

Kurash competition at the 2016 Asian Beach Games was held in Da Nang, Vietnam from 25 to 27 September 2016 at Biển Đông Park.

== Medalists ==
=== Men ===
Event	Gold	Silver	Bronze
−60 kg	Hossein Sheikholeslami; Iran	Otgony Chinbat; Mongolia	Lê Hoàng Chương; Vietnam
−60 kg	Hossein Sheikholeslami; Iran	Otgony Chinbat; Mongolia	Võ Phạm Hoàng Ân; Vietnam
−66 kg	Mirjon Tukhtaev; Uzbekistan	Ghanbar Ali Ghanbari; Iran	Chan Hao-cheng; Chinese Taipei
−66 kg	Mirjon Tukhtaev; Uzbekistan	Ghanbar Ali Ghanbari; Iran	Trịnh Thanh Nhựt; Vietnam
−73 kg	Suhrob Hudoyberdiev; Uzbekistan	Nurýagdy Jepbarow; Turkmenistan	Sufyan Nadhim; Iraq
−73 kg	Suhrob Hudoyberdiev; Uzbekistan	Nurýagdy Jepbarow; Turkmenistan	Dennis Catipon; Philippines
−81 kg	Elias Aliakbari; Iran	Mukhammadali Shamsidinov; Uzbekistan	Sanjar Abdyrahmanow; Turkmenistan
−81 kg	Elias Aliakbari; Iran	Mukhammadali Shamsidinov; Uzbekistan	Muhammet Temirow; Turkmenistan
−90 kg	Yhlas Setdarow; Turkmenistan	Nabi Aliýew; Turkmenistan	Pierre Bou Abboud; Lebanon
−90 kg	Yhlas Setdarow; Turkmenistan	Nabi Aliýew; Turkmenistan	Elie El-Chaer; Lebanon

=== Women ===
Event	Gold	Silver	Bronze
−48 kg	Hoàng Thị Tình; Vietnam	Văn Ngọc Tú; Vietnam	Zarina Saparowa; Turkmenistan
−48 kg	Hoàng Thị Tình; Vietnam	Văn Ngọc Tú; Vietnam	Parichat Wannapakdee; Thailand
−52 kg	Nguyễn Thị Thanh Thủy; Vietnam	Nguyễn Thị Quỳnh; Vietnam	Helen Dawa; Philippines
−52 kg	Nguyễn Thị Thanh Thủy; Vietnam	Nguyễn Thị Quỳnh; Vietnam	Pincky Balhara; India
−57 kg	Lee Wan-ting; Chinese Taipei	Lê Thị Tình; Vietnam	Nguyễn Thị Bích Ngọc; Vietnam
−57 kg	Lee Wan-ting; Chinese Taipei	Lê Thị Tình; Vietnam	Jenielou Mosqueda; Philippines
−63 kg	Nguyễn Thị Hương; Vietnam	Nguyễn Ngọc Diễm Phương; Vietnam	Su Shih-lin; Chinese Taipei
−63 kg	Nguyễn Thị Hương; Vietnam	Nguyễn Ngọc Diễm Phương; Vietnam	Altain Batzul; Mongolia
−70 kg	Nguyễn Thị Lan; Vietnam	Amisha Tokas; India	Penpaka Sarasan; Thailand
−70 kg	Nguyễn Thị Lan; Vietnam	Amisha Tokas; India	Nguyễn Thị Diệu Tiên; Vietnam

== Medal table ==
Rank	Nation	Gold	Silver	Bronze	Total
1	Vietnam (VIE)	4	4	5	13
2	Iran (IRI)	2	1	0	3
2	Uzbekistan (UZB)	2	1	0	3
4	Turkmenistan (TKM)	1	2	3	6
5	Chinese Taipei (TPE)	1	0	2	3
6	India (IND)	0	1	1	2
6	Mongolia (MGL)	0	1	1	2
8	Philippines (PHI)	0	0	3	3
9	Lebanon (LIB)	0	0	2	2
9	Thailand (THA)	0	0	2	2
11	Iraq (IRQ)	0	0	1	1
Totals (11 entries)		10	10	20	40

== Results ==
=== Men ===
==== 60 kg ====
25 September

Quarterfinals		Semifinals		Gold medal
Ajay Kumar (IND)	001
Lê Hoàng Chương (VIE)	110	Lê Hoàng Chương (VIE)	001
Marat Orazow (TKM)	000	Otgony Chinbat (MGL)	102
Otgony Chinbat (MGL)	002			Otgony Chinbat (MGL)	001
Võ Phạm Hoàng Ân (VIE)	100			Hossein Sheikholeslami (IRI)	001
Gun Jakwiwattanakul (THA)	000	Võ Phạm Hoàng Ân (VIE)	011
Hossein Sheikholeslami (IRI)	101	Hossein Sheikholeslami (IRI)	101
Gaurav Tokas (IND)	000

==== 66 kg ====
26 September

Round of 16
Jargalsaikhany Baasandash (MGL)	001
Kunal Sejwal (IND)	102
Hamza Babar (PAK)	000
Phan Vũ Nam (VIE)	103
Trịnh Thanh Nhựt (VIE)	101
Ihsan Falah (IRQ)	001
Nedir Allaberdiýew (TKM)	003
Ghanbar Ali Ghanbari (IRI)	011
Nilesh Balhara (IND)	011
Nutthawit Suwannawong (THA)	012

Quarterfinals
Mirjon Tukhtaev (UZB)	110
Kunal Sejwal (IND)	000
Chan Hao-cheng (TPE)	101
Phan Vũ Nam (VIE)	001
Joaquin Fernandez (PHI)	000
Trịnh Thanh Nhựt (VIE)	112
Ghanbar Ali Ghanbari (IRI)	101
Nutthawit Suwannawong (THA)	000

Semifinals
Mirjon Tukhtaev (UZB)	012
Chan Hao-cheng (TPE)	010
Trịnh Thanh Nhựt (VIE)	001
Ghanbar Ali Ghanbari (IRI)	101

Gold medal
Mirjon Tukhtaev (UZB)	002
Ghanbar Ali Ghanbari (IRI)	002

==== 73 kg ====
26 September

Round of 16
Nurýagdy Jepbarow (TKM)	111
Lin Sheng-min (TPE)	001
Deepak Deswal (IND)	001
Sufyan Nadhim (IRQ)	002
Munzer Jarida (SYR)	000
Suhrob Hudoyberdiev (UZB)	113
Dennis Catipon (PHI)	013
Kunal Deswal (IND)	000

Quarterfinals
Trần Thanh Hiển (VIE)	000
Nurýagdy Jepbarow (TKM)	101
Pratap Ghising (NEP)	000
Sufyan Nadhim (IRQ)	101
Nguyễn Tấn Công (VIE)	010
Suhrob Hudoyberdiev (UZB)	100
Nopphasit Lertsirisombut (THA)	000
Dennis Catipon (PHI)	001

Semifinals
Nurýagdy Jepbarow (TKM)	101
Sufyan Nadhim (IRQ)	000
Suhrob Hudoyberdiev (UZB)	102
Dennis Catipon (PHI)	000

Gold medal
Nurýagdy Jepbarow (TKM)	000
Suhrob Hudoyberdiev (UZB)	110

==== 81 kg ====
27 September

Round of 16
Pharuehatphasathonbodee Suwannaphueng (THA)	001
Mohammad Arif Malikyar (AFG)	001
Deepanshu Balayan (IND)	000
Elias Aliakbari (IRI)	101
Bùi Minh Quân (VIE)	002
Mukhammadali Shamsidinov (UZB)	101
Muhammet Temirow (TKM)	101
Gilbert Ramirez (PHI)	001

Quarterfinals
Sanjar Abdyrahmanow (TKM)	100
Huỳnh Trọng Nhân (VIE)	000
Pharuehatphasathonbodee Suwannaphueng (THA)	000
Elias Aliakbari (IRI)	100
Shivraj Magdum (IND)	000
Mukhammadali Shamsidinov (UZB)	104
Ganbaataryn Gonchigsumlaa (MGL)	000
Muhammet Temirow (TKM)	100

Semifinals
Sanjar Abdyrahmanow (TKM)	001
Elias Aliakbari (IRI)	001
Mukhammadali Shamsidinov (UZB)	001
Muhammet Temirow (TKM)	000

Gold medal
Elias Aliakbari (IRI)	002
Mukhammadali Shamsidinov (UZB)	001

==== 90 kg ====
27 September

Round of 16
Yhlas Setdarow (TKM)	102
Trần Thương (VIE)	002
Umair Tariq (PAK)	001
Nabi Aliýew (TKM)	010

Quarterfinals
Kapil Sehrawat (IND)	000
Pierre Bou Abboud (LIB)	102
Methkal Al-Jaramani (SYR)	001
Yhlas Setdarow (TKM)	101
Manish Kumar (IND)	001
Elie El-Chaer (LIB)	011
Nguyễn Hữu Hưng (VIE)	001
Nabi Aliýew (TKM)	102

Semifinals
Pierre Bou Abboud (LIB)	000
Yhlas Setdarow (TKM)	100
Elie El-Chaer (LIB)	001
Nabi Aliýew (TKM)	100

Gold medal
Yhlas Setdarow (TKM)	002
Nabi Aliýew (TKM)	001

=== Women ===
==== 48 kg ====
25 September

Round of 16
Baasansürengiin Oidovchimed (MGL)	000
Văn Ngọc Tú (VIE)	100
Aýşirin Haýdarowa (TKM)	001
Poorva Mathew (IND)	000

Quarterfinals
Nuttakan Saetung (THA)	000
Zarina Saparowa (TKM)	111
Swaita (IND)	000
Văn Ngọc Tú (VIE)	101
Bhagawati Majhi (NEP)	000
Parichat Wannapakdee (THA)	110
Hoàng Thị Tình (VIE)	100
Aýşirin Haýdarowa (TKM)	000

Semifinals
Zarina Saparowa (TKM)	000
Văn Ngọc Tú (VIE)	110
Parichat Wannapakdee (THA)	000
Hoàng Thị Tình (VIE)	002

Gold medal
Văn Ngọc Tú (VIE)	001
Hoàng Thị Tình (VIE)	001

==== 52 kg ====
25 September

Round of 16
Nichakan Seesai (THA)	000
Aýnur Amanowa (TKM)	103

Quarterfinals
Wanida Raksat (THA)	000
Nguyễn Thị Quỳnh (VIE)	101
Mahima Tokas (IND)	000
Helen Dawa (PHI)	001
Hsiao Hui-shan (TPE)	000
Nguyễn Thị Thanh Thủy (VIE)	101
Pincky Balhara (IND)	101
Aýnur Amanowa (TKM)	000

Semifinals
Nguyễn Thị Quỳnh (VIE)	102
Helen Dawa (PHI)	000
Nguyễn Thị Thanh Thủy (VIE)	111
Pincky Balhara (IND)	000

Gold medal
Nguyễn Thị Quỳnh (VIE)	000
Nguyễn Thị Thanh Thủy (VIE)	012

==== 57 kg ====
26 September

Round of 16
Lê Thị Tình (VIE)	100
Lea Farhat (LIB)	000

Quarterfinals
Lee Wan-ting (TPE)	106
Kanchan Rawat (IND)	000
Nguyễn Thị Bích Ngọc (VIE)	101
Sunaree Janjek (THA)	000
Aýna Jumakulyýewa (TKM)	000
Jenielou Mosqueda (PHI)	100
Phichamon Chuencharoen (THA)	002
Lê Thị Tình (VIE)	100

Semifinals
Lee Wan-ting (TPE)	100
Nguyễn Thị Bích Ngọc (VIE)	000
Jenielou Mosqueda (PHI)	010
Lê Thị Tình (VIE)	100

Gold medal
Lee Wan-ting (TPE)	015
Lê Thị Tình (VIE)	001

==== 63 kg ====
27 September

Round of 16
Su Shih-lin (TPE)	100
Caren Chammas (LIB)	000
Aarti (IND)	002
Eunice Lucero (PHI)	101

Quarterfinals
Nguyễn Thị Hương (VIE)	101
Gitanjali Pawar (IND)	000
Alaa Sebai (SYR)	000
Su Shih-lin (TPE)	100
Altain Batzul (MGL)	101
Apinya Pimngern (THA)	001
Nguyễn Ngọc Diễm Phương (VIE)	100
Eunice Lucero (PHI)	000

Semifinals
Nguyễn Thị Hương (VIE)	010
Su Shih-lin (TPE)	001
Altain Batzul (MGL)	010
Nguyễn Ngọc Diễm Phương (VIE)	100

Gold medal
Nguyễn Thị Hương (VIE)	001
Nguyễn Ngọc Diễm Phương (VIE)	000

==== 70 kg ====
27 September

Quarterfinals
Nguyễn Thị Lan (VIE)	100
Swati Choudhary (IND)	000
Amisha Tokas (IND)	001
Orazgül Seýidowa (TKM)	001
Nguyễn Thị Diệu Tiên (VIE)	102
Batbilegiin Myagmartsend (MGL)	000

Semifinals
Nguyễn Thị Lan (VIE)	100
Penpaka Sarasan (THA)	000
Amisha Tokas (IND)	001
Nguyễn Thị Diệu Tiên (VIE)	001

Gold medal
Nguyễn Thị Lan (VIE)	102
Amisha Tokas (IND)	000
