= Asian Beach Games =

Multi-sport event held every two years among Asian athletes

- 2008; 2010; 2012; 2014; 2016; 2026
- Olympic Council of Asia; NOCs

Asian Beach Games
- Abbreviation: ABG
- Purpose: Beach sports event for nations on the Asian continent
- Frequency: Every 2 years
- Inaugurated: 2008 Asian Beach Games in Bali, Indonesia
- Most recent: 2026 Asian Beach Games in Sanya, China
- Next event: 2028 Asian Beach Games in Cebu City, Philippines
- President: Joaan bin Hamad Al Thani
- Headquarters: Kuwait City, Kuwait
- Website: oca.asia

The Asian Beach Games, also known as ABG, is a multi-sport event held every biennially among athletes from all over Asia. The Games have been organized by the Olympic Council of Asia. The Games are described as the second or third largest Asian multi-sport event, after the Asian Games. Its popularity is increasing due to the low cost of temporary venues, with beaches and oceans already available, while spectators and tourists are also already available in sand and sea tourist areas.

In its history, five countries have hosted the Asian Beach Games. Forty-five nations have participated in the Games.

The most recent Games were held in Sanya, China from 22 to 30 April, while the next edition is scheduled to be held in Cebu City, Philippines in March 2028.

== Participating nations ==
45 nations whose NOCs are recognized by the OCA compete at the Asian Beach Games.

- Afghanistan
- Bahrain
- Bangladesh
- Bhutan
- Brunei
- Cambodia
- China
- Hong Kong
- India
- Indonesia
- Iran
- Iraq
- Japan
- Jordan
- Kazakhstan
- North Korea
- South Korea
- Kuwait
- Kyrgyzstan
- Laos
- Lebanon
- Macau
- Malaysia
- Maldives
- Mongolia
- Myanmar
- Nepal
- Oman
- Pakistan
- Palestine
- Philippines
- Qatar
- Saudi Arabia
- Singapore
- Sri Lanka
- Syria
- Chinese Taipei
- Tajikistan
- Thailand
- Timor-Leste
- Turkmenistan
- United Arab Emirates
- Uzbekistan
- Vietnam
- Yemen

== List of Asian Beach Games ==
Host cities of the Asian Beach Games

| Edition | Year | Host city | Host nation | Opened by | Start date | End date | Countries | Competitors | Sports | Events | Top-ranked team | Ref. |
|---|---|---|---|---|---|---|---|---|---|---|---|---|
| I | 2008 | Bali | Indonesia | President Susilo Bambang Yudhoyono | 18 October | 26 October | 41 | 1,665 | 17 | 59 | Indonesia | |
| II | 2010 | Muscat | Oman | Sultan Qaboos bin Said al Said | 8 December | 16 December | 43 | 1,131 | 14 | 52 | Thailand | |
| III | 2012 | Haiyang | China | State Councillor Ma Kai | 16 June | 22 June | 43 | 1,336 | 13 | 49 | China | |
| IV | 2014 | Phuket | Thailand | Privy Councilor Surayud Chulanont | 14 November | 23 November | 42 | 2,335 | 26 | 168 | Thailand | |
| V | 2016 | Da Nang | Vietnam | Prime Minister Nguyễn Xuân Phúc | 24 September | 3 October | 41 | 2,197 | 21 | 172 | Vietnam | |
| VI | 2026 (Note: Originally scheduled for 28 November–6 December 2020, the Games were postponed to 2–10 April 2021, and then again to 2026 due to the COVID-19 pandemic.) | Sanya | China | State Councillor Shen Yiqin | 22 April | 30 April | 45 | 1,635 | 14 | 62 | China | |
| VII | 2028 | Cebu City | Philippines | Future event | March | | Future event | | 24 | Future event | | |

== Sports ==
Key: = Discontinued

| Sport | Years |
|---|---|
| 3x3 basketball | 2008, since 2012 |
| Air sports | 2008, 2012–2014 |
| Aquathon | 2026 |
| Beach athletics | Since 2014 |
| Beach flag football | 2014 |
| Beach handball | All |
| Beach kabaddi | All |
| Beach kurash | 2014–2016 |
| Beach sambo | 2014–2016 |
| Beach sepak takraw | 2008–2016 |
| Beach soccer | All |
| Beach volleyball | All |
| Beach water polo | 2008–2010, since 2014 |
| Beach woodball | 2008–2016 |
| Beach wrestling | 2008, since 2014 |
| Bodybuilding | 2008–2010, 2014–2016 |
| Coastal rowing | 2016 |
| Dragon boat | 2008, 2012, 2026 |
| Duathlon | 2014 |
| Extreme sports | 2014 |
| Footvolley | 2014 |
| Jet ski | 2008–2010, 2014 |

| Sport | Years |
|---|---|
| Ju-jitsu | Since 2014 |
| Marathon swimming | 2008–2010, since 2014 |
| Muaythai | 2014–2016 |
| Paragliding Accuracy | 2008, 2014 |
| Paragliding Cross Country | 2008 |
| Paramotoring | 2012, 2014 |
| Pencak silat | 2008, 2016 |
| Pétanque | 2014–2016 |
| Roller speed skating | 2012 |
| Shuttlecock | 2016 |
| Sailing | 2008–2014, 2026 |
| Sport climbing | 2012–2014, 2026 |
| Squash | 2014 |
| Surfing | 2008 |
| Tent pegging | 2010 |
| Teqball | 2026 |
| Triathle | 2014 |
| Triathlon | 2008–2010, 2014 |
| Vocotruyen | 2016 |
| Vovinam | 2016 |
| Waterskiing | 2010–2014 |

== Medal count ==
Based on the addition of the 2026 Asian Beach Games :

| Rank | Nation | Gold | Silver | Bronze | Total |
|---|---|---|---|---|---|
| 1 | Thailand | 140 | 106 | 100 | 346 |
| 2 | China | 84 | 73 | 77 | 234 |
| 3 | Vietnam | 65 | 73 | 75 | 213 |
| 4 | Indonesia | 43 | 30 | 53 | 126 |
| 5 | Iran | 29 | 22 | 15 | 66 |
| 6 | South Korea | 23 | 39 | 50 | 112 |
| 7 | India | 15 | 7 | 29 | 51 |
| 8 | Kazakhstan | 14 | 19 | 23 | 56 |
| 9 | Japan | 14 | 15 | 24 | 53 |
| 10 | Mongolia | 14 | 5 | 16 | 35 |
| 11 | United Arab Emirates | 13 | 11 | 11 | 35 |
| 12 | Chinese Taipei | 10 | 22 | 33 | 65 |
| 13 | Qatar | 10 | 4 | 9 | 23 |
| 14 | Philippines | 8 | 14 | 34 | 56 |
| 15 | Oman | 7 | 6 | 6 | 19 |
| 16 | Bahrain | 7 | 3 | 2 | 12 |
| 17 | Uzbekistan | 7 | 1 | 9 | 17 |
| 18 | Malaysia | 6 | 17 | 20 | 43 |
| 19 | Pakistan | 6 | 16 | 17 | 39 |
| 20 | Hong Kong | 6 | 12 | 17 | 35 |
| 21 | Cambodia | 6 | 7 | 11 | 24 |
| 22 | Singapore | 6 | 4 | 13 | 23 |
| 23 | Myanmar | 5 | 11 | 8 | 24 |
| 24 | Laos | 5 | 5 | 33 | 43 |
| 25 | Kuwait | 4 | 9 | 8 | 21 |
| 26 | Iraq | 4 | 7 | 12 | 23 |
| 27 | Jordan | 4 | 7 | 7 | 18 |
| 28 | Syria | 4 | 3 | 8 | 15 |
| 29 | Turkmenistan | 3 | 8 | 16 | 27 |
| 30 | Lebanon | 2 | 4 | 12 | 18 |
| 31 | Afghanistan | 2 | 2 | 6 | 10 |
| 32 | Kyrgyzstan | 1 | 3 | 8 | 12 |
| 33 | Sri Lanka | 1 | 2 | 10 | 13 |
| 34 | Brunei | 1 | 2 | 6 | 9 |
| 35 | Yemen | 1 | 1 | 2 | 4 |
| 36 | Tajikistan | 1 | 0 | 4 | 5 |
| 37 | North Korea | 0 | 2 | 0 | 2 |
| 38 | Macau | 0 | 1 | 6 | 7 |
| 39 | Bangladesh | 0 | 0 | 4 | 4 |
| 40 | Saudi Arabia | 0 | 0 | 3 | 3 |
| 41 | Nepal | 0 | 0 | 2 | 2 |
| 42 | Maldives | 0 | 0 | 1 | 1 |
| 42 | Palestine | 0 | 0 | 1 | 1 |
| Totals (43 entries) | | 571 | 573 | 801 | 1,945 |

== See also ==
- Events of the OCA (Continental)
  - Asian Games
  - Asian Winter Games
  - Asian Youth Games
  - Asian Indoor and Martial Arts Games
- Events of the OCA (Regional)
  - East Asian Games
  - Central Asian Games
  - South Asian Games
  - West Asian Games
  - Southeast Asian Games
  - Pacific Games
- Events of the APC
  - Asian Para Games
  - Asian Youth Para Games
