= Bangladesh at the 2016 Asian Beach Games =

- IOC code: BAN
- NOC: Bangladesh Olympic Association

in Đà Nẵng
- Competitors: 23 (7 men,16 women) in 5 sports
- Medals Ranked 35th: Gold 0 Silver 0 Bronze 0 Total 0

Asian Beach Games appearances
- 2008; 2010; 2012; 2014; 2016

Bangladesh competed at the 2016 Asian Beach Games held in Danang, Vietnam from 24 September to 3 October 2016. It did not win any medals.

== Competitors ==
Sport	Men	Women	Total
3x3 Basketball	4	0	4
Beach Athletics	1	0	1
Beach Handball	0	10	10
Beach kabaddi	0	6	6
Beach Volleyball	2	0	2
Total	7	16	23
