= Wrestling at the 2018 Asian Games – Men's freestyle 74 kg =

Men's freestyle 74 kg at the 2018 Asian Games
- Venue: Jakarta Convention Center
- Date: 19 August 2018
- Competitors: 21 from 21 nations

Medalists
gold medal	Bekzod Abdurakhmonov	Uzbekistan
silver medal	Daniyar Kaisanov	Kazakhstan
bronze medal	Gong Byung-min	South Korea
bronze medal	Yuhi Fujinami	Japan

The men's freestyle 74 kilograms wrestling competition at the 2018 Asian Games in Jakarta was held on 19 August 2018 at the Jakarta Convention Center Assembly Hall.

== Schedule ==
All times are Western Indonesia Time (UTC+07:00)

Date	Time	Event
Sunday, 19 August 2018	13:00	Qualifications
Sunday, 19 August 2018	13:00	1/8 finals
Sunday, 19 August 2018	13:00	Quarterfinals
Sunday, 19 August 2018	13:00	Semifinals
Sunday, 19 August 2018	13:00	Repechages
Sunday, 19 August 2018	20:00	Finals

== Results ==
Legend

- F — Won by fall
- WO — Won by walkover

=== Main bracket ===
==== Final ====
Final
Daniyar Kaisanov (KAZ)	2
Bekzod Abdurakhmonov (UZB)	3

==== Top half ====
Qualifications

1/8 finals
Chanwit Aunjai (THA)	0
Cấn Tất Dự (VIE)	6^{F}
Abdulrahman Ibrahim (QAT)	0
Daniyar Kaisanov (KAZ)	10
Abdul Rehman (PAK)	0
Gamid Dzhalilov (TJK)	10
Wang Ming-liang (TPE)	4
Gong Byung-min (KOR)	14

Quarterfinals
Cấn Tất Dự (VIE)	0
Daniyar Kaisanov (KAZ)	10
Gamid Dzhalilov (TJK)	6
Gong Byung-min (KOR)	7

Semifinals
Daniyar Kaisanov (KAZ)	12
Gong Byung-min (KOR)	8

==== Bottom half ====
Qualifications
Mostafa Hosseinkhani (IRI)	10
Mohammad Ali Amzad (BAN)	0
Adam Batirov (BRN)	5
Sushil Kumar (IND)	3
Rizki Dermawan (INA)	4
Abdul Ghafar Qaderi (AFG)	6^{F}
Wu Wei (CHN)	4
Ganzorigiin Mandakhnaran (MGL)	8
Suresh Chunara (NEP)	0
Yuhi Fujinami (JPN)	10

1/8 finals
Mohammed Al-Quhali (YEM)
Bekzod Abdurakhmonov (UZB)	WO
Döwletmyrat Orazgylyjow (TKM)	2
Mostafa Hosseinkhani (IRI)	12
Adam Batirov (BRN)	15
Abdul Ghafar Qaderi (AFG)	5
Ganzorigiin Mandakhnaran (MGL)	2
Yuhi Fujinami (JPN)	13

Quarterfinals
Bekzod Abdurakhmonov (UZB)	4
Mostafa Hosseinkhani (IRI)	2
Adam Batirov (BRN)	2
Yuhi Fujinami (JPN)	8

Semifinals
Bekzod Abdurakhmonov (UZB)	11
Yuhi Fujinami (JPN)	1

=== Repechage ===
Repechage round 2
Abdulrahman Ibrahim (QAT)	6^{F}
Cấn Tất Dự (VIE)	10
Mohammed Al-Quhali (YEM)
Mostafa Hosseinkhani (IRI)	WO

Bronze medals
Abdulrahman Ibrahim (QAT)	0
Gong Byung-min (KOR)	10
Mostafa Hosseinkhani (IRI)	8
Yuhi Fujinami (JPN)	9

== Final standing ==
Rank	Athlete
1st place, gold medalist(s)	Bekzod Abdurakhmonov (UZB)
2nd place, silver medalist(s)	Daniyar Kaisanov (KAZ)
3rd place, bronze medalist(s)	Gong Byung-min (KOR)
3rd place, bronze medalist(s)	Yuhi Fujinami (JPN)
5	Abdulrahman Ibrahim (QAT)
5	Mostafa Hosseinkhani (IRI)
7	Adam Batirov (BRN)
8	Abdul Ghafar Qaderi (AFG)
9	Cấn Tất Dự (VIE)
10	Gamid Dzhalilov (TJK)
11	Ganzorigiin Mandakhnaran (MGL)
12	Wu Wei (CHN)
13	Wang Ming-liang (TPE)
14	Sushil Kumar (IND)
15	Döwletmyrat Orazgylyjow (TKM)
16	Rizki Dermawan (INA)
17	Chanwit Aunjai (THA)
18	Mohammad Ali Amzad (BAN)
18	Suresh Chunara (NEP)
18	Abdul Rehman (PAK)
—	Mohammed Al-Quhali (YEM)
