= Vocotruyen at the 2016 Asian Beach Games =

- Venue: Biển Đông Park
- Dates: 29 September – 2 October 2016

Vietnamese martial arts (Vocotruyen Vietnam) competition at the 2016 Asian Beach Games was held in Da Nang, Vietnam from 29 September to 2 October 2016 at Bien Dong park.

== Medalists ==
=== Men ===
Event	Gold	Silver	Bronze
50 kg	Yaser Pormehr; Iran	Đặng Trần Anh Tuấn; Vietnam	Shrinay Gulab Jadhav; India
50 kg	Yaser Pormehr; Iran	Đặng Trần Anh Tuấn; Vietnam	Detsada Pasansouk; Laos
55 kg	Khavy Phommakhamthong; Laos	Huỳnh Hữu Đường; Vietnam	Firouz Mokhtari; Iran
55 kg	Khavy Phommakhamthong; Laos	Huỳnh Hữu Đường; Vietnam	Shubham Sanjay Nakate; India
60 kg	Khamla Soukaphone; Laos	Hoàng Kỳ Anh; Vietnam	Sagvish Gulab Jadhav; India
60 kg	Khamla Soukaphone; Laos	Hoàng Kỳ Anh; Vietnam	Chhem Sila; Cambodia
65 kg	Bùi Lê Tấn Vũ; Vietnam	Soy Phan Nich; Cambodia	Ramit Bharat Waghole; India
65 kg	Bùi Lê Tấn Vũ; Vietnam	Soy Phan Nich; Cambodia	Noukhith Latsaphao; Laos
70 kg	Nguyễn Minh Hiếu; Vietnam	Hossein Yazdani; Iran	Bouapha Vlasith; Laos
70 kg	Nguyễn Minh Hiếu; Vietnam	Hossein Yazdani; Iran	Harshal Tanaji Garad; India
Openweight	Mohsen Gholami; Iran	Trần Trung Hậu; Vietnam	Shreeyash Viaykumar Chavan; India
Openweight	Mohsen Gholami; Iran	Trần Trung Hậu; Vietnam	Kalanh Khotsombath; Laos

=== Women ===
Event	Gold	Silver	Bronze
48 kg	Nguyễn Thị Ái Vân; Vietnam	Khiev Chendaroth; Cambodia	Aboli Ashru Phalke; India
48 kg	Nguyễn Thị Ái Vân; Vietnam	Khiev Chendaroth; Cambodia	Huỳnh Mai Ngân Thúy; Vietnam
52 kg	Shweta Ramdas More; India	Nguyễn Thị Tuyết Dung; Vietnam	Mimi Yoysaykham; Laos
52 kg	Shweta Ramdas More; India	Nguyễn Thị Tuyết Dung; Vietnam	Sam Tharoth; Cambodia
56 kg	Nguyễn Thị Tuyết Mai; Vietnam	Phouthong Ehpriyanut; Cambodia	Bhagyashri Shankar Mahabale; India
56 kg	Nguyễn Thị Tuyết Mai; Vietnam	Phouthong Ehpriyanut; Cambodia	Vilayphone Tawane; Laos
60 kg	Try Sothavy; Cambodia	Hồ Thị Hiền; Vietnam	Ngũ Thị Thuyết; Vietnam
60 kg	Try Sothavy; Cambodia	Hồ Thị Hiền; Vietnam	None awarded
Openweight	Võ Thị Phương Hiếu; Vietnam	Vy Srey Khouch; Cambodia	Nguyễn Thị Hằng; Vietnam
Openweight	Võ Thị Phương Hiếu; Vietnam	Vy Srey Khouch; Cambodia	Khammai Lathsavong; Laos

== Medal table ==
Rank	Nation	Gold	Silver	Bronze	Total
1	Vietnam (VIE)	5	6	3	14
2	Iran (IRI)	2	1	1	4
3	Laos (LAO)	2	0	7	9
4	Cambodia (CAM)	1	4	2	7
5	India (IND)	1	0	8	9
Totals (5 entries)		11	11	21	43

== Results ==
=== Men ===
==== 50 kg ====
Quarterfinals; 29 September
Đặng Trần Anh Tuấn (VIE)	KO
Nguyễn Thanh Khiết (VIE)

Semifinals; 30 September
Shrinay Gulab Jadhav (IND)
Yaser Pormehr (IRI)	KO
Detsada Pasansouk (LAO)	0
Đặng Trần Anh Tuấn (VIE)	2

Gold medal 2 October
Yaser Pormehr (IRI)	DQ
Đặng Trần Anh Tuấn (VIE)

==== 55 kg ====
Quarterfinals; 29 September
Phan Vũ Danh (VIE)	1
Huỳnh Hữu Đường (VIE)	2

Semifinals; 1 October
Firouz Mokhtari (IRI)	0
Khavy Phommakhamthong (LAO)	2
Shubham Sanjay Nakate (IND)	0
Huỳnh Hữu Đường (VIE)	2

Gold medal 2 October
Khavy Phommakhamthong (LAO)	KO
Huỳnh Hữu Đường (VIE)

==== 60 kg ====
Quarterfinals; 29 September
Mohammad Salehi (IRI)	0
Khamla Soukaphone (LAO)	2
Hoàng Kỳ Anh (VIE)	2
Nguyễn Hợp Hải (VIE)	1

Semifinals; 30 September
Sagvish Gulab Jadhav (IND)
Khamla Soukaphone (LAO)	RSC
Chhem Sila (CAM)	0
Hoàng Kỳ Anh (VIE)	2

Gold medal 2 October
Khamla Soukaphone (LAO)	2
Hoàng Kỳ Anh (VIE)	0

==== 65 kg ====
Quarterfinals; 29 September
Ramit Bharat Waghole (IND)	RSC
Rajesh Baban Kamble (IND)
Bùi Lê Tấn Vũ (VIE)	KO
Nguyễn Văn Thắng (VIE)
Noukhith Latsaphao (LAO)	2
Ali Aghajari (IRI)	0

Semifinals; 30 September
Soy Phan Nich (CAM)	RSC
Ramit Bharat Waghole (IND)
Bùi Lê Tấn Vũ (VIE)	2
Noukhith Latsaphao (LAO)	0

Gold medal 2 October
Soy Phan Nich (CAM)	0
Bùi Lê Tấn Vũ (VIE)	2

==== 70 kg ====
Quarterfinals; 29 September
Nguyễn Minh Hiếu (VIE)	KO
Huỳnh Văn Cường (VIE)
Hossein Yazdani (IRI)	2
Oeun Rasmey (CAM)	0

Semifinals; 1 October
Bouapha Vlasith (LAO)	1
Nguyễn Minh Hiếu (VIE)	2
Harshal Tanaji Garad (IND)
Hossein Yazdani (IRI)	RSC

Gold medal 2 October
Nguyễn Minh Hiếu (VIE)	2
Hossein Yazdani (IRI)	1

==== Openweight ====
Quarterfinals; 29 September
Has Chantheon (CAM)	0
Mohsen Gholami (IRI)	2
Lương Bá Tá (VIE)
Trần Trung Hậu (VIE)	KO

Semifinals; 1 October
Shreeyash Viaykumar Chavan (IND)
Mohsen Gholami (IRI)	RSC
Kalanh Khotsombath (LAO)
Trần Trung Hậu (VIE)	KO

Gold medal 2 October
Mohsen Gholami (IRI)	KO
Trần Trung Hậu (VIE)

=== Women ===
==== 48 kg ====
Semifinals; 30 September		Gold medal 2 October
Khiev Chendaroth (CAM)	RSC
Aboli Ashru Phalke (IND)		Khiev Chendaroth (CAM)	0
Nguyễn Thị Ái Vân (VIE)	RSC	Nguyễn Thị Ái Vân (VIE)	2
Huỳnh Mai Ngân Thúy (VIE)

==== 52 kg ====
Quarterfinals; 29 September
Nguyễn Thị Tuyết Dung (VIE)	2
Phạm Thị Tha (VIE)	0

Semifinals; 30 September
Shweta Ramdas More (IND)	RSC
Mimi Yoysaykham (LAO)
Sam Tharoth (CAM)	0
Nguyễn Thị Tuyết Dung (VIE)	2

Gold medal 2 October
Shweta Ramdas More (IND)	DQ
Nguyễn Thị Tuyết Dung (VIE)

==== 56 kg ====
Quarterfinals; 29 September
Thạch Kim Duyên (VIE)	0
Nguyễn Thị Tuyết Mai (VIE)	2

Semifinals; 1 October
Phouthong Ehpriyanut (CAM)	RSC
Bhagyashri Shankar Mahabale (IND)
Vilayphone Tawane (LAO)	0
Nguyễn Thị Tuyết Dung (VIE)	2

Gold medal 2 October
Phouthong Ehpriyanut (CAM)	0
Nguyễn Thị Tuyết Dung (VIE)	2

==== 60 kg ====
Semifinals; 30 September		Gold medal 2 October
		Try Sothavy (CAM)	KO
Ngũ Thị Thuyết (VIE)	0	Hồ Thị Hiền (VIE)
Hồ Thị Hiền (VIE)	2

==== Openweight ====
Quarterfinals; 29 September
Khammai Lathsavong (LAO)	KO
Douangchay Thalengliep (LAO)

Semifinals; 1 October
Võ Thị Phương Hiếu (VIE)	2
Nguyễn Thị Hằng (VIE)	0
Vy Srey Khouch (CAM)	2
Khammai Lathsavong (LAO)	0

Gold medal 2 October
Võ Thị Phương Hiếu (VIE)	2
Vy Srey Khouch (CAM)	0
