= Kurash at the 2026 Asian Games – Women's 78 kg =

Women's 78 kg at the 2026 Asian Games
- Venue: Aichi Budokan
- Dates: 28 September 2026
- Competitors: 12 from 8 nations

Medalists
gold medal	Pokizakhon Kamoldinova	Uzbekistan
silver medal	Mo Su-min	South Korea
bronze medal	Shokhista Nazarova	Uzbekistan
bronze medal	Pincky Balhara	India

The women's 78 kilograms Kurash competition at the 2026 Asian Games in Nagoya was held on 28 September 2026 at the Aichi Prefectural Martial Arts Hall.

Uzbekistan's Pokizakhon Kamoldinova defeated South Korea's Mo Su-min in the final to win the gold medal. Mo took silver, while Pincky Balhara of India and Shokhista Nazarova of Uzbekistan shared the bronze medals.

== Schedule ==
All times are Japan Standard Time (UTC+09:00)

Date	Time	Event
Monday, 28 September 2026	09:40	Round of 16
Monday, 28 September 2026	09:40	Quarterfinals
Monday, 28 September 2026	14:00	Semifinals
Monday, 28 September 2026	14:00	Final

== Results ==
Round of 16
Nurana Hezretowa (TKM)	101
Saniet Talaibekova (KGZ)	000
Pokizakhon Kamoldinova (UZB)	103
Azhar Isaeva (KGZ)	000
Lim Ga-ram (KOR)	010
Margaret Fajardo (PHI)	001
Byambasürengiin Naidansüren (MGL)	100
Rui Tomori (JPN)	002

Quarterfinals
Shokhista Nazarova (UZB)	002
Nurana Hezretowa (TKM)	001
Pokizakhon Kamoldinova (UZB)	100
Sabina Kadyrowa (TKM)	000
Pincky Balhara (IND)	001
Lim Ga-ram (KOR)	000
Byambasürengiin Naidansüren (MGL)	000
Mo Su-min (KOR)	100

Semifinals
Shokhista Nazarova (UZB)	000
Pokizakhon Kamoldinova (UZB)	016
Pincky Balhara (IND)	000
Mo Su-min (KOR)	010

Final
Pokizakhon Kamoldinova (UZB)	100
Mo Su-min (KOR)	000
