= Beach athletics at the 2016 Asian Beach Games =

- Venue: Sơn Thủy Beach
- Dates: 26–29 September 2016

Beach athletics competition at the 2016 Asian Beach Games was held in Danang, Vietnam from 26 to 29 September 2016 at Son Thuy Beach, Danang, Vietnam.

== Medalists ==
=== Men ===
Event	Gold		Silver		Bronze	
60 m	Barakat Al-Harthi; Oman	6.44	Reza Ghasemi; Iran	6.55	Pan Xinyue; China	6.77
4 × 60 m relay	Thailand; Kritsada Namsuwan; Aphisit Promkaew; Jaran Sathoengram; Bandit Chuangchai	26.19	Oman; Barakat Al-Harthi; Yahya Al-Noufali; Samir Al-Riyami; Khalid Al-Ghailani	26.58	Vietnam; Bùi Văn Đông; Ngô Thế Nguyên; Bùi Bá Hạnh; Trịnh Việt Tú	26.93
Cross-country	Idriss Moussa Yousef; Qatar	19:06.45	Phạm Tiến Sản; Vietnam	19:16.19	Jamal Hairane; Qatar	19:34.21
Cross-country team	Qatar; Musab Adam Ali; Jamal Hairane; Hashim Salah Mohamed; Idriss Moussa Yousef	9	Vietnam; Đỗ Văn Tính; Lê Quang Hòa; Phạm Tiến Sản; Trần Văn Công; Võ Vũ Linh	12	Thailand; Tanaton Graiyarat; Nattawut Innum; Sanchai Namkhet; Boonthung Srisung; Yothin Yaprajan	29
Long jump	Zhong Peifeng; China	7.53	Nguyễn Văn Công; Vietnam	7.47	Sobhan Taherkhani; Iran	7.35
Triple jump	Nguyễn Văn Hùng; Vietnam	16.63	Pratchaya Tepparak; Thailand	15.81	Mark Harry Diones; Philippines	15.72
Shot put	Ali Samari; Iran	18.29	Guo Yanxiang; China	17.78	Promrob Juntima; Thailand	17.10

=== Women ===
Event	Gold		Silver		Bronze	
60 m	Lê Tú Chinh; Vietnam	7.60	Khanrutai Pakdee; Thailand	7.73	Lê Thị Mộng Tuyền; Vietnam	7.74
4 × 60 m relay	Thailand; Parichat Charoensuk; Khanrutai Pakdee; Phensri Chairoek; Supawan Thipat	28.62	Vietnam; Lê Thị Mộng Tuyền; Lê Tú Chinh; Đỗ Thị Quyên; Nguyễn Thị Oanh	29.16	China; Huang Guifen; Wang Xuan; Wang Rong; Lin Huijun	29.87
Cross-country	Phạm Thị Huệ; Vietnam	13.56.29	Nguyễn Thị Oanh; Vietnam	14.02.01	Lu Mengyao; China	14:54.93
Cross-country team	Vietnam; Hoàng Thị Thanh; Lò Thị Thanh; Nguyễn Thị Oanh; Phạm Thị Huệ; Vũ Thị Ly	6	Thailand; Tanaphon Assawawongcharoen; Woraphan Nuanlsri; Suneeka Prichaprong; Natthaya Thanaronnawat; Kamonporn Yaemsee	25	None awarded	
Long jump	Bùi Thị Thu Thảo; Vietnam	6.32	Nguyễn Thị Trúc Mai; Vietnam	6.11	Marestella Sunang; Philippines	6.10
Triple jump	Vũ Thị Mến; Vietnam	13.11	Trần Huệ Hoa; Vietnam	13.06	Parinya Chuaimaroeng; Thailand	12.66
Shot put	Liu Xiangrong; China	16.06	Sun Yue; China	14.50	Areerat Intadis; Thailand	14.36

== Medal table ==
Rank	Nation	Gold	Silver	Bronze	Total
1	Vietnam (VIE)	6	7	2	15
2	Thailand (THA)	2	3	4	9
3	China (CHN)	2	2	3	7
4	Qatar (QAT)	2	0	1	3
5	Iran (IRI)	1	1	1	3
6	Oman (OMA)	1	1	0	2
7	Philippines (PHI)	0	0	2	2
Totals (7 entries)		14	14	13	41

== Results ==
=== Men ===
==== 60 m ====
===== Round 1 =====
26 September

Rank	Athlete	Time
Heat 1
1	Barakat Al-Harthi (OMA)	6.96
2	Reza Ghasemi (IRI)	6.97
3	Bandit Chuangchai (THA)	7.09
4	Trịnh Việt Tú (VIE)	7.23
5	Liang Jinsheng (CHN)	7.42
6	Ali Hassan Al-Jassim (QAT)	7.62
Heat 2
1	Pan Xinyue (CHN)	7.10
2	Yahya Al-Noufali (OMA)	7.11
3	Eid Abdulla Al-Kuwari (QAT)	7.18
4	Masbah Ahmmed (BAN)	7.32
—	Sobhan Taherkhani (IRI)	DNS

===== Final =====
27 September

Rank	Athlete	Time
1st place, gold medalist(s)	Barakat Al-Harthi (OMA)	6.44
2nd place, silver medalist(s)	Reza Ghasemi (IRI)	6.55
3rd place, bronze medalist(s)	Pan Xinyue (CHN)	6.77
4	Trịnh Việt Tú (VIE)	6.80
5	Yahya Al-Noufali (OMA)	6.83
6	Bandit Chuangchai (THA)	6.84
7	Eid Abdulla Al-Kuwari (QAT)	6.87
8	Masbah Ahmmed (BAN)	7.06

==== 4 × 60 m relay ====
28 September

Rank	Team	Time
1st place, gold medalist(s)	Thailand (THA)	26.19
2nd place, silver medalist(s)	Oman (OMA)	26.58
3rd place, bronze medalist(s)	Vietnam (VIE)	26.93
4	Philippines (PHI)	30.93
—	China (CHN)	DSQ

==== Cross-country ====
29 September

Rank	Athlete	Time
1st place, gold medalist(s)	Idriss Moussa Yousef (QAT)	19:06.45
2nd place, silver medalist(s)	Phạm Tiến Sản (VIE)	19:16.19
3rd place, bronze medalist(s)	Jamal Hairane (QAT)	19:34.21
4	Đỗ Văn Tính (VIE)	19:45.22
5	Hashim Salah Mohamed (QAT)	19:50.06
6	Trần Văn Công (VIE)	19:50.13
7	Võ Vũ Linh (VIE)	20:00.50
8	Boonthung Srisung (THA)	20:05.78
9	Sanchai Namkhet (THA)	20:06.04
10	Luo Tianfan (CHN)	20:16.89
11	Musab Adam Ali (QAT)	20:29.49
12	Nattawut Innum (THA)	20:40.98
13	Tanaton Graiyarat (THA)	20:58.04
14	Mervin Guarte (PHI)	20:58.15
15	Lê Quang Hòa (VIE)	21:12.49
16	Christopher Ulboc (PHI)	21:30.53
17	Yothin Yaprajan (THA)	21:33.38
18	Zhao Yingkui (CHN)	21:44.19
19	Jomar Angus (PHI)	22:20.64
20	Wenlie Maulas (PHI)	20:37.34
21	Immuel Camino (PHI)	22:55.41

==== Cross-country team ====
29 September

Rank	Team	Score
1st place, gold medalist(s)	Qatar (QAT)	9
2nd place, silver medalist(s)	Vietnam (VIE)	12
3rd place, bronze medalist(s)	Thailand (THA)	29
4	Philippines (PHI)	49

==== Long jump ====
26 September

Rank	Athlete	Result
1st place, gold medalist(s)	Zhong Peifeng (CHN)	7.53
2nd place, silver medalist(s)	Nguyễn Văn Công (VIE)	7.47
3rd place, bronze medalist(s)	Sobhan Taherkhani (IRI)	7.35
4	Tang Gongchen (CHN)	7.35
5	Julian Fuentes (PHI)	7.21
6	Phichet Tharuaruk (THA)	7.10
7	Bùi Văn Đông (VIE)	6.97
8	Saran Saenbuakham (THA)	6.93

==== Triple jump ====
29 September

Rank	Athlete	Result
1st place, gold medalist(s)	Nguyễn Văn Hùng (VIE)	16.63
2nd place, silver medalist(s)	Pratchaya Tepparak (THA)	15.81
3rd place, bronze medalist(s)	Mark Harry Diones (PHI)	15.72
4	Liu Mingxuan (CHN)	15.42
5	Varunyoo Kongnil (THA)	15.35
6	Li Shichao (CHN)	13.65

==== Shot put ====
27 September

Rank	Athlete	Result
1st place, gold medalist(s)	Ali Samari (IRI)	18.29
2nd place, silver medalist(s)	Guo Yanxiang (CHN)	17.78
3rd place, bronze medalist(s)	Promrob Juntima (THA)	17.10
4	Mosab Aisha (SYR)	16.04
5	Thawat Khachin (THA)	16.02
6	Gao Jian (CHN)	15.02
7	Lam Wai (HKG)	13.80
8	Nguyễn Khắc Huy (VIE)	11.47

=== Women ===
==== 60 m ====
===== Round 1 =====
26 September

Rank	Athlete	Time
Heat 1
1	Lê Tú Chinh (VIE)	7.77
2	Mazoon Al-Alawi (OMA)	7.90
3	Lam On Ki (HKG)	7.93
4	Wanwisa Kongthong (THA)	7.94
5	Huang Guifen (CHN)	8.04
Heat 2
1	Khanrutai Pakdee (THA)	7.77
2	Lê Thị Mộng Tuyền (VIE)	7.90
3	Lin Huijun (CHN)	8.13
4	Chan Ka Sin (HKG)	8.41

===== Final =====
27 September

Rank	Athlete	Time
1st place, gold medalist(s)	Lê Tú Chinh (VIE)	7.60
2nd place, silver medalist(s)	Khanrutai Pakdee (THA)	7.73
3rd place, bronze medalist(s)	Lê Thị Mộng Tuyền (VIE)	7.74
4	Mazoon Al-Alawi (OMA)	7.83
5	Lam On Ki (HKG)	7.89
6	Huang Guifen (CHN)	7.90
7	Wanwisa Kongthong (THA)	7.93
8	Lin Huijun (CHN)	8.15

==== 4 × 60 m relay ====
28 September

Rank	Team	Time
1st place, gold medalist(s)	Thailand (THA)	28.62
2nd place, silver medalist(s)	Vietnam (VIE)	29.16
3rd place, bronze medalist(s)	China (CHN)	29.87

==== Cross-country ====
29 September

Rank	Athlete	Time
1st place, gold medalist(s)	Phạm Thị Huệ (VIE)	13:56.29
2nd place, silver medalist(s)	Nguyễn Thị Oanh (VIE)	14:02.01
3	Lò Thị Thanh (VIE)	14:12.05
4	Hoàng Thị Thanh (VIE)	14:28.32
5	Vũ Thị Ly (VIE)	14:43.36
3rd place, bronze medalist(s)	Lu Mengyao (CHN)	14:54.93
7	Natthaya Thanaronnawat (THA)	15:07.05
8	Woraphan Nuanlsri (THA)	15:18.13
9	Zhu Yuxuan (CHN)	15:26.70
10	Tanaphon Assawawongcharoen (THA)	15:30.09
11	Suneeka Prichaprong (THA)	15:36.67
12	Kamonporn Yaemsee (THA)	16:42.26
—	Wang Xuan (CHN)	DNS

- Lu Mengyao was awarded bronze because of no three-medal sweep per country rule.

==== Cross-country team ====
29 September

Rank	Team	Score
1st place, gold medalist(s)	Vietnam (VIE)	6
2nd place, silver medalist(s)	Thailand (THA)	25
—	China (CHN)	DNS

==== Long jump ====
26 September

Rank	Athlete	Result
1st place, gold medalist(s)	Bùi Thị Thu Thảo (VIE)	6.32
2nd place, silver medalist(s)	Nguyễn Thị Trúc Mai (VIE)	6.11
3rd place, bronze medalist(s)	Marestella Sunang (PHI)	6.10
4	Parinya Chuaimaroeng (THA)	6.04
5	Wang Rong (CHN)	5.93
6	Sunisa Khotseemueang (THA)	5.77
7	Chan Ka Sin (HKG)	5.37
8	Ma Xiaoling (CHN)	5.26
9	Mazoon Al-Alawi (OMA)	4.76

==== Triple jump ====
28 September

Rank	Athlete	Result
1st place, gold medalist(s)	Vũ Thị Mến (VIE)	13.11
2nd place, silver medalist(s)	Trần Huệ Hoa (VIE)	13.06
3rd place, bronze medalist(s)	Parinya Chuaimaroeng (THA)	12.66
4	Zheng Jiaqi (CHN)	11.38
—	Sunisa Khotseemueang (THA)	DNS
—	Zeng Rui (CHN)	DNS

==== Shot put ====
27 September

Rank	Athlete	Result
1st place, gold medalist(s)	Liu Xiangrong (CHN)	16.06
2nd place, silver medalist(s)	Sun Yue (CHN)	14.50
3rd place, bronze medalist(s)	Areerat Intadis (THA)	14.36
4	Sawitri Thongchao (THA)	13.39
5	Hiba Omar (SYR)	12.84
