= Vovinam at the 2016 Asian Beach Games =

- Venue: Biển Đông Park
- Dates: 30 September – 2 October 2016

Vovinam competition at the 2016 Asian Beach Games was held in Da Nang, Vietnam from 30 September to 2 October 2016 at Bien Dong Park.

== Medalists ==
=== Men ===
Event	Gold	Silver	Bronze
Five gate form (Ngũ môn quyền)	Philavanh Chanthakaly; Laos	Huỳnh Khắc Nguyên; Vietnam	Meisam Jahanipour; Iran
Five gate form (Ngũ môn quyền)	Philavanh Chanthakaly; Laos	Huỳnh Khắc Nguyên; Vietnam	Peng Shu-chun; Chinese Taipei
Dual machete form (Song luyện mã tấu)	Vietnam; Lâm Đông Vượng; Trần Thế Thường	Cambodia; Chin Piseth; Chren Bunlong	India; Alok Kumar; Prashant Singh
Dual machete form (Song luyện mã tấu)	Vietnam; Lâm Đông Vượng; Trần Thế Thường	Cambodia; Chin Piseth; Chren Bunlong	Myanmar; Khine Zin Win; Phyo Min Soe
Dual form 3 (Song luyện 3)	Myanmar; Bo Bo; Ma Na Kui	Vietnam; Lâm Trí Linh; Lê Toàn Trung	Cambodia; Prak Sovanny; Sok Sambat
Dual form 3 (Song luyện 3)	Myanmar; Bo Bo; Ma Na Kui	Vietnam; Lâm Trí Linh; Lê Toàn Trung	Laos; Phokham Phommachanh; Saosanga Thammavongsa
Leg attack techniques (Đòn chân tấn công)	Vietnam; Huỳnh Khắc Nguyên; Nguyễn Bình Định; Nguyễn Văn Cường; Trần Công Tạo	Myanmar; Ma Na Kui; Myo Tun Ent; Win Htay Aung; Ye Wint Htoo	Cambodia; Chren Bunlong; Koeut Sopheak; Ly Boramy; San Socheat
Leg attack techniques (Đòn chân tấn công)	Vietnam; Huỳnh Khắc Nguyên; Nguyễn Bình Định; Nguyễn Văn Cường; Trần Công Tạo	Myanmar; Ma Na Kui; Myo Tun Ent; Win Htay Aung; Ye Wint Htoo	Afghanistan; Abdul Aziz Hakimi; Lamar Hares Rasouli; Sayed Ahmad Bilal Sadaat; Sayed Ahmad Fawad Sadat
Multiple weapon (Đa luyện vũ khí nam)	Myanmar; Chan Myae Aung; Myo Tun Ent; Win Htay Aung; Ye Wint Htoo	Vietnam; Đinh Hải Thành; Lê Đức Duy; Lê Phi Bảo; Mai Đình Chiến	Laos; Phoutthasin Piengpanya; Ketsada Sihalath; Saosanga Thammavongsa; Phailath Thammavongsa
Multiple weapon (Đa luyện vũ khí nam)	Myanmar; Chan Myae Aung; Myo Tun Ent; Win Htay Aung; Ye Wint Htoo	Vietnam; Đinh Hải Thành; Lê Đức Duy; Lê Phi Bảo; Mai Đình Chiến	Cambodia; Chin Piseth; Chren Bunlong; Koeut Sopheak; San Socheat

=== Women ===
Event	Gold	Silver	Bronze
Dragon tiger form (Long hổ quyền)	Manik Trisna Dewi Wetan; Indonesia	Deepa Prakash Gawale; India	Yoshimi Sadamatsu; Japan
Dragon tiger form (Long hổ quyền)	Manik Trisna Dewi Wetan; Indonesia	Deepa Prakash Gawale; India	Nguyễn Thị Ngọc Trâm; Vietnam
Dual sword form (Song luyện kiếm)	Vietnam; Lê Thị Thương; Mai Thị Kim Thùy	Myanmar; Hnin Thida; Khine War Phoo	Cambodia; Pov Sokha; Soeur Chanleakhena
Dual sword form (Song luyện kiếm)	Vietnam; Lê Thị Thương; Mai Thị Kim Thùy	Myanmar; Hnin Thida; Khine War Phoo	Laos; Mala Chanthalacksa; Phiksamay Insoumang

=== Mixed ===
Event	Gold	Silver	Bronze
Female self-defense (Tự vệ nữ)	Cambodia; Ly Boramy; Pov Sokha	Vietnam; Nguyễn Hoàng Dũ; Nguyễn Thị Hoài Nương	Laos; Ketsada Sihalath; Mala Chanthalacksa
Female self-defense (Tự vệ nữ)	Cambodia; Ly Boramy; Pov Sokha	Vietnam; Nguyễn Hoàng Dũ; Nguyễn Thị Hoài Nương	Myanmar; Khine Zin Win; Su Lae Phyo
Multiple weapon (Đa luyện vũ khí nữ)	Cambodia; Ly Boramy; Prak Sovanny; San Socheat; Pal Chhor Raksmy	Myanmar; Chan Myae Aung; Ma Na Kui; Ye Wint Htoo; Khine Kyawt Kyawt Wai	Vietnam; Huỳnh Khắc Nguyên; Nguyễn Hoàng Dũ; Nguyễn Văn Cường; Lê Thị Thủy
Multiple weapon (Đa luyện vũ khí nữ)	Cambodia; Ly Boramy; Prak Sovanny; San Socheat; Pal Chhor Raksmy	Myanmar; Chan Myae Aung; Ma Na Kui; Ye Wint Htoo; Khine Kyawt Kyawt Wai	Laos; Phongphon; Xaysana Hoanglokham; Phoutthasin Piengpanya; Phiksamay Insoumang

== Medal table ==
Rank	Nation	Gold	Silver	Bronze	Total
1	Vietnam (VIE)	3	4	2	9
2	Myanmar (MYA)	2	3	2	7
3	Cambodia (CAM)	2	1	4	7
4	Laos (LAO)	1	0	5	6
5	Indonesia (INA)	1	0	0	1
6	India (IND)	0	1	1	2
7	Afghanistan (AFG)	0	0	1	1
7	Chinese Taipei (TPE)	0	0	1	1
7	Iran (IRI)	0	0	1	1
7	Japan (JPN)	0	0	1	1
Totals (10 entries)		9	9	18	36

== Results ==
=== Men ===
==== Five gate form ====
1 October

Rank	Athlete	Score
1st place, gold medalist(s)	Philavanh Chanthakaly (LAO)	275
2nd place, silver medalist(s)	Huỳnh Khắc Nguyên (VIE)	270
3rd place, bronze medalist(s)	Meisam Jahanipour (IRI)	260
3rd place, bronze medalist(s)	Peng Shu-chun (TPE)	260
5	Ly Boramy (CAM)	256
6	Bo Bo (MYA)	255
7	I Gusti Agung Ngurah Suardyana (INA)	253
8	Mohammed Imran Ali (IND)	246

==== Dual machete form ====
2 October

Rank	Team	Score
1st place, gold medalist(s)	Vietnam (VIE); Lâm Đông Vượng; Trần Thế Thường	275
2nd place, silver medalist(s)	Cambodia (CAM); Chin Piseth; Chren Bunlong	269
3rd place, bronze medalist(s)	India (IND); Alok Kumar; Prashant Singh	261
3rd place, bronze medalist(s)	Myanmar (MYA); Khine Zin Win; Phyo Min Soe	261
5	Iran (IRI); Saeid Ahmadi; Mehdi Amirifar	255

==== Dual form 3 ====
2 October

Rank	Team	Score
1st place, gold medalist(s)	Myanmar (MYA); Bo Bo; Ma Na Kui	274
2nd place, silver medalist(s)	Vietnam (VIE); Lâm Trí Linh; Lê Toàn Trung	270
3rd place, bronze medalist(s)	Cambodia (CAM); Prak Sovanny; Sok Sambat	261
3rd place, bronze medalist(s)	Laos (LAO); Phokham Phommachanh; Saosanga Thammavongsa	261
5	India (IND); Shashank Bajrang Kathade; Shaikh Farukh	252

==== Leg attack techniques ====
30 September

Rank	Team	Score
1st place, gold medalist(s)	Vietnam (VIE)	275
2nd place, silver medalist(s)	Myanmar (MYA)	268
3rd place, bronze medalist(s)	Cambodia (CAM)	261
3rd place, bronze medalist(s)	Afghanistan (AFG)	259
5	India (IND)	250
6	Laos (LAO)	247

==== Multiple weapon ====
30 September

Rank	Team	Score
1st place, gold medalist(s)	Myanmar (MYA)	272
2nd place, silver medalist(s)	Vietnam (VIE)	268
3rd place, bronze medalist(s)	Laos (LAO)	261
3rd place, bronze medalist(s)	Cambodia (CAM)	260
5	India (IND)	255

=== Women ===
==== Dragon tiger form ====
1 October

Rank	Athlete	Score
1st place, gold medalist(s)	Manik Trisna Dewi Wetan (INA)	275
2nd place, silver medalist(s)	Deepa Prakash Gawale (IND)	267
3rd place, bronze medalist(s)	Yoshimi Sadamatsu (JPN)	261
3rd place, bronze medalist(s)	Nguyễn Thị Ngọc Trâm (VIE)	261
5	Khine War Phoo (MYA)	258
6	Soeur Chanleakhena (CAM)	255
7	Huang Ling-yi (TPE)	249
—	Phiksamay Insoumang (LAO)	DNF

==== Dual sword form ====
2 October

Rank	Team	Score
1st place, gold medalist(s)	Vietnam (VIE); Lê Thị Thương; Mai Thị Kim Thùy	276
2nd place, silver medalist(s)	Myanmar (MYA); Hnin Thida; Khine War Phoo	269
3rd place, bronze medalist(s)	Cambodia (CAM); Pov Sokha; Soeur Chanleakhena	260
3rd place, bronze medalist(s)	Laos (LAO); Mala Chanthalacksa; Phiksamay Insoumang	260
5	India (IND); Omita Devi Haobam; Pushpa Devi Loushambam	253

=== Mixed ===
==== Female self-defense ====
1 October

Rank	Team	Score
1st place, gold medalist(s)	Cambodia (CAM); Ly Boramy; Pov Sokha	275
2nd place, silver medalist(s)	Vietnam (VIE); Nguyễn Hoàng Dũ; Nguyễn Thị Hoài Nương	270
3rd place, bronze medalist(s)	Laos (LAO); Ketsada Sihalath; Mala Chanthalacksa	262
3rd place, bronze medalist(s)	Myanmar (MYA); Khine Zin Win; Su Lae Phyo	262
5	Indonesia (INA); I Gusti Agung Ngurah Suardyana; Manik Trisna Dewi Wetan	258
6	India (IND); Devrao Shankarrao Kapse; Pragati Sontakke	251
7	Chinese Taipei (TPE); Peng Shu-chun; Huang Ling-yi	247

==== Multiple weapon ====
30 September

Rank	Team	Score
1st place, gold medalist(s)	Cambodia (CAM)	273
2nd place, silver medalist(s)	Myanmar (MYA)	268
3rd place, bronze medalist(s)	Vietnam (VIE)	263
3rd place, bronze medalist(s)	Laos (LAO)	259
