= Beach wrestling at the 2016 Asian Beach Games =

Wrestling competitions

- Venue: Biển Đông Park
- Dates: 30 September – 2 October 2016

Beach wrestling competition at the 2016 Asian Beach Games was held in Danang, Vietnam from 30 September to 2 October 2016 at Bien Dong Park.

== Medalists ==
=== Men ===
Event	Gold	Silver	Bronze
60 kg	Damjingiin Baljinnyam; Mongolia	Choi Sung-min; South Korea	Komchan Ngamthaweesuk; Thailand
60 kg	Damjingiin Baljinnyam; Mongolia	Choi Sung-min; South Korea	Azamat Kenzhebek Uulu; Kyrgyzstan
70 kg	Mohammad Naderi; Iran	Muhammad Nazir; Pakistan	Buyanjavyn Batzorig; Mongolia
70 kg	Mohammad Naderi; Iran	Muhammad Nazir; Pakistan	Kim Jun-chul; South Korea
80 kg	Omid Hassantabar; Iran	Chanwit Aunjai; Thailand	Gong Byung-min; South Korea
80 kg	Omid Hassantabar; Iran	Chanwit Aunjai; Thailand	Batchuluuny Ankhbayar; Mongolia
90 kg	Muhammad Inam; Pakistan	Mohammad Sadati; Iran	Ýusup Melejaýew; Turkmenistan
90 kg	Muhammad Inam; Pakistan	Mohammad Sadati; Iran	Chyngyz Kerimkulov; Kyrgyzstan

=== Women ===
Event	Gold	Silver	Bronze
50 kg	Nguyễn Thị Xuân; Vietnam	Fang Kaixuan; China	Hikaru Aono; Japan
50 kg	Nguyễn Thị Xuân; Vietnam	Fang Kaixuan; China	Orasa Sookdongyor; Thailand
60 kg	Um Ji-eun; South Korea	Sun Yazhen; China	Đào Thị Hương; Vietnam
60 kg	Um Ji-eun; South Korea	Sun Yazhen; China	Noemi Tener; Philippines
70 kg	Yang Bin; China	Nguyễn Thị Vinh; Vietnam	Bae Gon-ji; South Korea
70 kg	Yang Bin; China	Nguyễn Thị Vinh; Vietnam	Salinee Srisombat; Thailand
+70 kg	Trần Thị Hương; Vietnam	Chang Hui-tsz; Chinese Taipei	Miku Saito; Japan
+70 kg	Trần Thị Hương; Vietnam	Chang Hui-tsz; Chinese Taipei	Trương Thị Thanh Hiền; Vietnam

== Medal table ==
Rank	Nation	Gold	Silver	Bronze	Total
1	Vietnam (VIE)	2	1	2	5
2	Iran (IRI)	2	1	0	3
3	China (CHN)	1	2	0	3
4	South Korea (KOR)	1	1	3	5
5	Pakistan (PAK)	1	1	0	2
6	Mongolia (MGL)	1	0	2	3
7	Thailand (THA)	0	1	3	4
8	Chinese Taipei (TPE)	0	1	0	1
9	Japan (JPN)	0	0	2	2
9	Kyrgyzstan (KGZ)	0	0	2	2
11	Philippines (PHI)	0	0	1	1
11	Turkmenistan (TKM)	0	0	1	1
Totals (12 entries)		8	8	16	32

== Results ==
=== Men ===
==== 60 kg ====
1 October

Round of 16
Eddy Khidzer (SGP)	0
Eng Phanit (CAM)	3
Vansalong Phiaphep (LAO)	0
Azamat Kenzhebek Uulu (KGZ)	3
Damjingiin Baljinnyam (MGL)	4
Ahmad Dab (SYR)	0
Phạm Văn Có (VIE)	3
Hossamaddin Abu Siafe (JOR)	0

Quarterfinals
Ali Mohammad Moseni (AFG)	0
Alvin Lobreguito (PHI)	3
Choi Sung-min (KOR)	3
Komchan Ngamthaweesuk (THA)	0
Eng Phanit (CAM)	0
Azamat Kenzhebek Uulu (KGZ)	3
Damjingiin Baljinnyam (MGL)	3
Phạm Văn Có (VIE)	1

Semifinals
Alvin Lobreguito (PHI)	0
Choi Sung-min (KOR)	3
Azamat Kenzhebek Uulu (KGZ)	0
Damjingiin Baljinnyam (MGL)	3

Gold medal
Choi Sung-min (KOR)	0
Damjingiin Baljinnyam (MGL)	3

Final of repechage
Ahmad Dab (SYR)	0
Phạm Văn Có (VIE)	3

Bronze medals
Komchan Ngamthaweesuk (THA)	3
Alvin Lobreguito (PHI)	1
Phạm Văn Có (VIE)	0
Azamat Kenzhebek Uulu (KGZ)	3

==== 70 kg ====
1 October

Round of 16
Abdulrahman Ibrahim (QAT)	0
Malek Jan Afzalzada (AFG)	3
Seýitnur Ataýew (TKM)	4
Vixay Moonnasing (LAO)	0
Jirawat Eaimsamang (THA)	0
Buyanjavyn Batzorig (MGL)	3
Nguon Makara (CAM)	0
Mohammad Naderi (IRI)	3
Kim Jun-chul (KOR)	3
Toh Xin Ran (SGP)	0
Zakaria Shishani (JOR)	3
Bai Zhibin (CHN)	0
Joseph Angana (PHI)	0
Daniar Ibraimov (KGZ)	4
Muhammad Nazir (PAK)	3
Nguyễn Đình Long (VIE)	1

Quarterfinals
Malek Jan Afzalzada (AFG)	3
Seýitnur Ataýew (TKM)	2
Buyanjavyn Batzorig (MGL)	0
Mohammad Naderi (IRI)	3
Kim Jun-chul (KOR)	3
Zakaria Shishani (JOR)	0
Daniar Ibraimov (KGZ)	0
Muhammad Nazir (PAK)	3

Semifinals
Malek Jan Afzalzada (AFG)	0
Mohammad Naderi (IRI)	3
Kim Jun-chul (KOR)	0
Muhammad Nazir (PAK)	3

Gold medal
Mohammad Naderi (IRI)	3
Muhammad Nazir (PAK)	0

Final of repechage
Nguon Makara (CAM)	0
Buyanjavyn Batzorig (MGL)	3
Nguyễn Đình Long (VIE)	3
Daniar Ibraimov (KGZ)	2

Bronze medals
Buyanjavyn Batzorig (MGL)	3
Malek Jan Afzalzada (AFG)	0
Nguyễn Đình Long (VIE)	0
Kim Jun-chul (KOR)	3

==== 80 kg ====
2 October

Round of 16
Noritomo Eto (JPN)	2
Döwletmyrat Orazgylyjow (TKM)	1
Abdul Ghafar Qaderi (AFG)	3
Jefferson Manatad (PHI)	2
Bakhit Sharif Badr (QAT)	0
Muhammad Asad Butt (PAK)	3
Nairisiga (CHN)	0
Omid Hassantabar (IRI)	3
Heng Vuthy (CAM)	0
Batchuluuny Ankhbayar (MGL)	4

Quarterfinals
Gong Byung-min (KOR)	0
Chanwit Aunjai (THA)	3
Cấn Tất Dự (VIE)	1
Noritomo Eto (JPN)	1
Abdul Ghafar Qaderi (AFG)	0
Muhammad Asad Butt (PAK)	3
Omid Hassantabar (IRI)	3
Batchuluuny Ankhbayar (MGL)	1

Semifinals
Chanwit Aunjai (THA)	2
Noritomo Eto (JPN)	0
Muhammad Asad Butt (PAK)	0
Omid Hassantabar (IRI)	3

Gold medal
Chanwit Aunjai (THA)	0
Omid Hassantabar (IRI)	3

Final of repechage
Nairisiga (CHN)	1
Batchuluuny Ankhbayar (MGL)	4

Bronze medals
Gong Byung-min (KOR)	3
Noritomo Eto (JPN)	0
Batchuluuny Ankhbayar (MGL)	3
Muhammad Asad Butt (PAK)	2

==== 90 kg ====
2 October

===== Pools =====
Group A
Pos	Athlete	Pld	W	L	PAK	TKM	SYR	JOR	SGP
1	Muhammad Inam (PAK)	4	4	0	—	3–0	3–0	4–0	4–0
2	Ýusup Melejaýew (TKM)	4	3	1	0–3	—	3–1	3–0	4–0
3	Naouzat Saleh (SYR)	4	2	2	0–3	1–3	—	3–1	3–0
4	Ameer Ishakat (JOR)	4	1	3	0–4	0–3	1–3	—	4–0
5	Hidayat Haron (SGP)	4	0	4	0–4	0–4	0–3	0–4	—

Group B
Pos	Athlete	Pld	W	L	IRI	KGZ	CHN	AFG	QAT
1	Mohammad Sadati (IRI)	4	4	0	—	3–1	3–0	3–0	3–0
2	Chyngyz Kerimkulov (KGZ)	4	3	1	1–3	—	3–0	3–0	3–0
3	Lin Zushen (CHN)	4	2	2	0–3	0–3	—	3–0	3–0
4	Rajab Naseri (AFG)	4	1	3	0–3	0–3	0–3	—	3–0
5	Jafar Khan (QAT)	4	0	4	0–3	0–3	0–3	0–3	—

Source: OCA

===== Final =====
Gold medal
Muhammad Inam (PAK)	3
Mohammad Sadati (IRI)	0

=== Women ===
==== 50 kg ====
30 September

===== Pools =====
Group A
Pos	Athlete	Pld	W	L	VIE	JPN	PHI	CAM
1	Nguyễn Thị Xuân (VIE)	3	3	0	—	3–0	3–0	3–0
2	Hikaru Aono (JPN)	3	2	1	0–3	—	3–0	3–0
3	Richelle Piollo (PHI)	3	1	2	0–3	0–3	—	4–0
4	Chey Chan Raksmey (CAM)	3	0	3	0–3	0–3	0–4	—

Group B
Pos	Athlete	Pld	W	L	CHN	THA	KOR	LAO
1	Fang Kaixuan (CHN)	3	3	0	—	2–1	3–1	4–0
2	Orasa Sookdongyor (THA)	3	2	1	1–2	—	3–0	4–0
3	Son Se-ryeon (KOR)	3	1	2	1–3	0–3	—	3–1
4	Manivanh Inthilath (LAO)	3	0	3	0–4	0–4	1–3	—

Source: OCA

===== Final =====
Gold medal
Nguyễn Thị Xuân (VIE)	1
Fang Kaixuan (CHN)	0

==== 60 kg ====
30 September

===== Pools =====
Group A
Pos	Athlete	Pld	W	L	KOR	VIE	THA	TPE
1	Um Ji-eun (KOR)	3	3	0	—	4–0	3–0	2–0
2	Đào Thị Hương (VIE)	3	2	1	0–4	—	WO	2^{*}–2
3	Sriprapa Thokaew (THA)	3	1	2	0–3		—	2–0
4	Chiu Hsin-ju (TPE)	3	0	3	0–2	2–2^{*}	0–2	—

Group B
Pos	Athlete	Pld	W	L	CHN	PHI	CAM	LAO
1	Sun Yazhen (CHN)	3	3	0	—	3–1	3–0	WO
2	Noemi Tener (PHI)	3	2	1	1–3	—	3–0	3–0
3	Ni Samnang (CAM)	3	1	2	0–3	0–3	—	3–0
4	Oday Latxomphou (LAO)	3	0	3		0–3	0–3	—

Source: OCA

===== Final =====
Gold medal
Um Ji-eun (KOR)	3
Sun Yazhen (CHN)	2

==== 70 kg ====
30 September

Pos	Athlete	Pld	W	L	CHN	VIE	KOR	THA	PHI
1	Yang Bin (CHN)	4	4	0	—	3–1	1–0	3–0	4–0
2	Nguyễn Thị Vinh (VIE)	4	3	1	1–3	—	1–0	3–0	1–0
3	Bae Gon-ji (KOR)	4	2	2	0–1	0–1	—	3–0	WO
4	Salinee Srisombat (THA)	4	1	3	0–3	0–3	0–3	—	3–1
5	Efrelyn Crosby (PHI)	4	0	4	0–4	0–1		1–3	—

Source: OCA

==== +70 kg ====
1 October

Pos	Athlete	Pld	W	L	VIE	TPE	JPN	VIE
1	Trần Thị Hương (VIE)	3	3	0	—	3–2	3–0	WO
2	Chang Hui-tsz (TPE)	3	2	1	2–3	—	2–2	2–0
3	Miku Saito (JPN)	3	1	2	0–3	2–2	—	WO
4	Trương Thị Thanh Hiền (VIE)	3	0	3		0–2		—

Source: OCA
