= Afghanistan at the 2016 Asian Beach Games =

- IOC code: AFG
- NOC: Afghanistan National Olympic Committee

in Đà Nẵng
- Competitors: 51 in 9 sports
- Medals Ranked 32ndth: Gold 0 Silver 0 Bronze 3 Total 3

Asian Beach Games appearances
- 2008; 2010; 2012; 2014; 2016; 2026

Afghanistan competed at the 2016 Asian Beach Games held in Danang, Vietnam from 24 September to 3 October 2016

== Competitors ==
Sport	Men	Women	Total
Beach Handball	7	0	7
Beach Kurash	1	0	1 (Note: Athlete also competing in beach sambo)
Beach Sambo	7	0	7
Beach Soccer	10	0	10
Beach Volleyball	4	0	4
Beach Water Polo	11	0	11
Beach wrestling	4	0	4
Ju-jitsu	4	0	4
Vovinam	4	0	4
Total	51	0	51

=== Medal by Date ===
Medals by date
Day	Date	1st place, gold medalist(s)	2nd place, silver medalist(s)	3rd place, bronze medalist(s)	Total
0	23 Sep 2016	0	0	0	0
1	24 Sep 2016	Opening Ceremony			
2	25 Sep 2016	0	0	0	0
3	26 Sep 2016	0	0	0	0
4	27 Sep 2016	0	0	0	0
5	28 Sep 2016	0	0	0	0
6	29 Sep 2016	0	0	0	0
7	30 Sep 2016	0	0	2	2
8	1 Oct 2016	0	0	0	0
9	2 Oct 2016	0	0	1	1
10	3 Oct 2016	Closing Ceremony			
Total		0	0	3	3

=== Medalists ===
Medal	Name	Sport	Event	Date
Bronze	Shuaib Mohammad Yousouf	Sambo	Men's -62 kg	30 Sep 2016
Bronze	Mohammad Arif Malik Yar	Sambo	Men's +90 kg	2 Oct 2016
Bronze	Rasouli Lamar Hares; Sadaat Sayed Ahmed Bilal; Sadaat Sayed Fawad Bilal; Hakimi Abdul Aziz	Vovinam	Men's Leg Attack Technique	30 Sep 2016
