= Myanmar at the 2016 Asian Beach Games =

- IOC code: MYA
- NOC: Myanmar Olympic Committee

in Đà Nẵng
- Competitors: 24 in 2 sports
- Medals Ranked 13ndth: Gold 3 Silver 5 Bronze 3 Total 11

Asian Beach Games appearances
- 2008; 2010; 2012; 2014; 2016; 2026

Myanmar competed at the 2016 Asian Beach Games held in Danang, Vietnam from 24 September to 3 October 2016.

== Competitors ==
| Sport | Men | Women | Total |
|---|---|---|---|
| Beach sepak takraw | 6 | 6 | 12 |
| Vovinam | 8 | 4 | 12 |
| Total | 14 | 10 | 24 |

=== Medal by Date ===
Medals by date
| Day | Date | 1st place, gold medalist(s) | 2nd place, silver medalist(s) | 3rd place, bronze medalist(s) | Total |
|---|---|---|---|---|---|
| 0 | 23 Sep 2016 | 0 | 0 | 0 | 0 |
| 1 | 24 Sep 2016 | Opening Ceremony | | | |
| 2 | 25 Sep 2016 | 0 | 0 | 0 | 0 |
| 3 | 26 Sep 2016 | 0 | 0 | 0 | 0 |
| 4 | 27 Sep 2016 | 1 | 1 | 0 | 2 |
| 5 | 28 Sep 2016 | 0 | 0 | 1 | 1 |
| 6 | 29 Sep 2016 | 0 | 1 | 0 | 1 |
| 7 | 30 Sep 2016 | 1 | 2 | 0 | 3 |
| 8 | 1 Oct 2016 | 0 | 0 | 1 | 1 |
| 9 | 2 Oct 2016 | 1 | 1 | 1 | 3 |
| 10 | 3 Oct 2016 | Closing Ceremony | | | |
| Total | | 3 | 5 | 3 | 11 |

=== Medalists ===
| Medal | Name | Sport | Event | Date |
|---|---|---|---|---|
| Gold | Aung Myo Naing; Aung Myo Swe; Myo Myint Zaw; Thant Zin Oo; Wai Lin Aung | Beach sepak takraw | Men's Trio | 27 Sep 2016 |
| Gold | Ma Na Kui; Bo Bo | Vovinam | Men's Dual Form Number 3 | 2 Oct 2016 |
| Gold | Chan Myae Aung; Ye Wint Htoo; Myo Htun Ent; Win Htay Aung | Vovinam | Men's Weapon Self-Defence | 30 Sep 2016 |
| Silver | Aung Myo Naing; Aung Myo Swe; Aung Naing Oo; Myo Myint Zaw; Thant Zin Oo; Wai Lin Aung | Beach sepak takraw | Men's Regu | 29 Sep 2016 |
| Silver | Khin Hnin Wai; Nant Yin Yin Myint; Phyu Phyu Tan; Su Tin Zar Naing; Thin Zar Soe Nyunt | Beach sepak takraw | Women's Trio | 27 Sep 2016 |
| Silver | Khine War Phoo; Hnin Thida | Vovinam | Women's Dual Sword Form | 2 Oct 2016 |
| Silver | Ye Wint Htoo; Myo Htun Ent; Ma Na Kui; Win Htay Aung | Vovinam | Men's Leg Attack Technique | 30 Sep 2016 |
| Silver | Chan Myae Aung; Ye Wint Htoo; Ma Na Kui; Khine Kyawt Kyawt Wai | Vovinam | Women's Weapon Self-Defence | 30 Sep 2016 |
| Bronze | Khin Hnin Wai; Nant Yin Yin Myint; Phyu Phyu Tan; Su Mon Aung; Su Tin Zar Naing; Thin Zar Soe Nyunt | Beach sepak takraw | Women's Regu | 28 Sep 2016 |
| Bronze | Khine Zin Win; Phyo Min Soe | Vovinam | Men's Dual Machete Form | 2 Oct 2016 |
| Bronze | Khine Zin Win; Su Lae Phyo | Vovinam | Women's Self Defense | 1 Oct 2016 |
