= 2016 Asian Beach Games =

Multi-sport event in Da Nang, Vietnam

V Asian Beach Games
- Host city: Da Nang, Vietnam
- Motto: Shining Sea, Bright Future (Vietnamese: Toả sáng đại dương, rực sáng tương lai)
- Nations: 41
- Athletes: 2,197
- Events: 172 in 22 sports
- Opening: 24 September
- Closing: 3 October
- Opened by: Prime Minister Nguyễn Xuân Phúc
- Closed by: Prime Minister Nguyễn Xuân Phúc
- Torch lighter: Hoàng Xuân Vinh
- Main venue: Bien Dong Park
- Website: abg2016.com

The 5th Asian Beach Games (Vietnamese: Đại hội Thể thao Bãi biển châu Á lần thứ năm) was held in Da Nang, Vietnam. It was the second time for Vietnam to host an Asian multi-sports event, after Hanoi held the 2009 Asian Indoor Games. This was only the first time that an event was not held in Hanoi.

== Venues ==
Name	Sport(s)
Bien Dong Park	Beach soccer, Kabaddi, Fitness, Basketball 3x3, Water polo, Muaythai, Vietnam traditional martial arts, Wrestling, Sambo, Jujitsu, Kurash, Vovinam, Pencak Silat, Open Water Swimming, Coastal Rowing, Opening and closing ceremonies
Phuong Trang Area	Shuttlecock, Petanque
My Khe Beach	Volleyball, Handball, Sepaktakraw
Son Thuy Beach	Athletics, Woodball

== Sports ==
- 3x3 basketball (2)
- Aquatics
  - Beach water polo (1)
  - Open water swimming (4)
- Beach athletics (14)
- Beach handball (2)
- Beach kabaddi (2)
- Beach kurash (10)
- Beach sambo (8)
- Beach sepak takraw (6)
- Beach soccer (1)
- Beach volleyball (2)
- Beach woodball (11)
- Beach wrestling (8)
- Bodybuilding (7)
- Coastal rowing (6)
- Ju-jitsu (18)
- Muay Thai (16)
- Pétanque (9)
- Pencak silat (18)
- Shuttlecock (7)
- Vocotruyen (11)
- Vovinam (9)

== Calendar ==
OC	Opening ceremony	●	Event competitions	1	Event finals	CC	Closing ceremony

September-October 2016	21st Wed	22nd Thu	23rd Fri	24th Sat	25th Sun	26th Mon	27th Tue	28th Wed	29th Thu	30th Fri	1st Sat	2nd Sun	3rd Mon	Gold medals
3x3 basketball						●	●	●	2					2
Aquatics – Beach water polo							●	●	●	●	1			1
Aquatics – Open water swimming			2		2									4
Beach athletics						2	4	3	5					14
Beach handball					●	●	●	●	●	●	●	2		2
Beach kabaddi			●	●	●	●	2							2
Beach kurash					3	3	4							10
Beach sambo										3	3	2		8
Beach sepak takraw					●	●	2	1	1	●	1	1		6
Beach soccer					●	●	●		●	●		1		1
Beach volleyball					●	●	●	●	●	●	●	2		2
Beach woodball					2	2	1	1	1	●	2	2		11
Beach wrestling										3	3	2		8
Bodybuilding							●	7						7
Coastal rowing							●	2	2		2			6
Ju-jitsu					8	7	3							18
Muaythai	●	●	●		●	16								16
Pétanque					●	3	2	2	●	2				9
Pencak silat							4	2	●	●	12			18
Shuttlecock						●	3	2	●	2				7
Vocotruyen									●	●	●	11		11
Vovinam										3	3	3		9
Ceremonies				OC									CC	
Total gold medals	0	0	2	0	15	33	25	20	11	13	27	26	0	172
September-October 2016	21st Wed	22nd Thu	23rd Fri	24th Sat	25th Sun	26th Mon	27th Tue	28th Wed	29th Thu	30th Fri	1st Sat	2nd Sun	3rd Mon	Gold medals

== Participating nations ==
41 out of the 45 Asian countries took part. Palestine, Yemen, North Korea, and Saudi Arabia did not compete, while Kuwait competed as Independent Olympic Athletes due to suspension for political interference. Below is a list of all the participating NOCs; the number of competitors per delegation is indicated in brackets.

- Afghanistan (51)
- Bahrain (15)
- Bangladesh (23)
- Bhutan (8)
- Brunei (4)
- Cambodia (44)
- China (152)
- Chinese Taipei (53)
- Timor-Leste (4)
- Hong Kong (83)
- Independent Olympic Athletes (1)
- India (169)
- Indonesia (66)
- Iran (33)
- Iraq (28)
- Japan (54)
- Jordan (25)
- Kazakhstan (34)
- Kyrgyzstan (11)
- Laos (81)
- Lebanon (29)
- Macau (10)
- Malaysia (64)
- Maldives (20)
- Mongolia (37)
- Myanmar (24)
- Nepal (18)
- Oman (29)
- Pakistan (41)
- Philippines (65)
- Qatar (39)
- Singapore (28)
- South Korea (62)
- Sri Lanka (40)
- Syria (12)
- Tajikistan (10)
- Thailand (291)
- Turkmenistan (53)
- United Arab Emirates (38)
- Uzbekistan (26)
- Vietnam (322)

== Medal table ==
Host nation

Rank	Nation	Gold	Silver	Bronze	Total
1	Vietnam (VIE)*	52	44	43	139
2	Thailand (THA)	36	24	30	90
3	China (CHN)	12	18	19	49
4	Iran (IRI)	9	6	6	21
5	Mongolia (MGL)	7	4	8	19
6	Cambodia (CAM)	6	6	9	21
7	Qatar (QAT)	5	1	1	7
8	Jordan (JOR)	4	4	5	13
9	United Arab Emirates (UAE)	4	2	3	9
10	Malaysia (MAS)	3	6	5	14
11	Indonesia (INA)	3	5	9	17
12	Kazakhstan (KAZ)	3	5	4	12
13	Myanmar (MYA)	3	5	3	11
14	Laos (LAO)	3	3	24	30
15	Uzbekistan (UZB)	3	1	3	7
16	India (IND)	2	4	18	24
17	Philippines (PHI)	2	4	15	21
18	Chinese Taipei (TPE)	2	4	10	16
19	Turkmenistan (TKM)	2	4	9	15
20	Singapore (SGP)	2	3	7	12
21	Pakistan (PAK)	2	3	6	11
22	Bahrain (BRN)	2	0	0	2
23	South Korea (KOR)	1	4	11	16
24	Oman (OMA)	1	3	0	4
25	Japan (JPN)	1	2	7	10
26	Iraq (IRQ)	1	1	8	10
27	Kyrgyzstan (KGZ)	1	0	4	5
28	Hong Kong (HKG)	0	4	4	8
29	Lebanon (LIB)	0	1	6	7
30	Syria (SYR)	0	1	2	3
31	Macau (MAC)	0	0	5	5
32	Afghanistan (AFG)	0	0	3	3
33	Sri Lanka (SRI)	0	0	2	2
34	Brunei (BRU)	0	0	1	1
34	Independent Olympic Athletes (IOA)	0	0	1	1
Totals (35 entries)		172	172	291	635

== Marketing ==
=== Logo ===
The Games' logo is designed to simulate the waves and sand, as well as the healthy and active athletes participating in the Games.

With the power of sports, all parts of the logo rise up to form a large V shape (which means "Vietnam", "Victory" or the fifth Roman numeral which is read as "V") which confirms the role of the host countries, highlighting the spirit of competition as well as the aspirations of the athletes to win.

=== Mascot ===
Chim Yen, the official mascot.

The mascot of the games is a swiftlet named Chim Yen. Special characteristic of the southern central coastal region of Vietnam is famous for bird nest - a product of high economic value in general and a specialty of Da Nang in particular.

The mascot is a stylized little boy with funny hair on the head, a small V-shaped tail (a characteristic of oats), holding a lit torch represents the spirit of unity, peace and health of human life. The sun of the Olympic Council of Asia and on the traditional wave of mascot costumes symbolizing the Asian Beach Games. The colors used for the mascot is blue, red, black and gold representing the blue sea water, golden sand and feathers of birds.

Preceded by Phuket	Asian Beach Games; Danang; 5th ABG (2016)	Succeeded by Sanya
