= India at the 2016 Asian Beach Games =

- IOC code: IND
- NOC: Indian Olympic Association

in Đà Nẵng
- Competitors: 208 in 13 sports
- Medals Ranked 16thth: Gold 2 Silver 4 Bronze 18 Total 24

Asian Beach Games appearances
- 2008; 2010; 2012; 2014; 2016; 2026

India competed at the 2016 Asian Beach Games held in Danang, Vietnam from 24 September to 3 October 2016. The Indian Olympic Association sent a larger contingent than the previous game as 208 athletes participated in 13 different games at the fifth edition of beach games. India finished at 16th position, winning 2 Gold, 4 Silver and 18 Bronze medals.N. Ramachandran, president of Indian Olympic Association, received an OCA Award of Merit by the Olympic Council of Asia for his contributions to sports in Asia at Danang on 25 September 2016.

Pincky Balhara won the first medal for India in the 52kg wrestling (kurash) event, finishing third on the second day of games. On the same day, Harish Banghel won a silver medal in men's middleweight Muay Thai event.

Indian women's kabaddi team, which had finished at top in previously held Asian Beach Games, won their five consecutive gold and first for India in this event defeating Thailand. Shweta Ramdas, won the second gold medal for India defeating Nguyen Thi Tuyet Dung of Vietnam in the 48–52kg traditional martial arts event. Men's kabaddi team finished at second position, losing to Pakistan in the final match.

Manoj Kumar Majumdar finished at third position in the beach body-building game (up to 178cm). In the women's wrestling event in the 70kg category, Amisha Tokas lost in final to Nguyen Thi Lan of Vietnam but won another silver medal for India. Deepa Prakash Gawale finished at second position winning a silver medal in the women's Dragon Tiger Form, Vovinam event. She lost to Manik Trisna of Indonesia. A 13 member Indian team was sent to compete in the Vovinam event, however, Gawale, won the silver medal, Alok Kumar and Prashant Singh won bronze medal among them.
