= European Amateurs =

European Amateurs or variant, may refer to:

- European Amateur Championship (golf), annual amateur male golf tournament of the European Golf Association
- European Ladies Amateur Championship (golf), annual amateur female golf tournament of the European Golf Association
- European Amateur Team Championship (golf), annual amateur male golf tournament of the European Golf Association
- European Ladies' Team Championship (golf), annual amateur female golf tournament of the European Golf Association
- European Amateur Boxing Championships

== See also ==
- European Championship (disambiguation)
- European Open (disambiguation)
- European Masters (disambiguation)
