= Oceania Championship =

Disambiguation page

Countries usually participating in Oceania championships. Note the difference to the geographical borders of Oceania.

An Oceania Championship is a top level international sports competition between Oceania athletes or sports teams representing their respective countries or professional sports clubs.

== List of championships ==
Athletics

- Oceania Area Championships in Athletics

Australian rules football

- Australian Football League
- Australian Football International Cup
- Australian Football World Tour
- Australian Football Championships night series
- Australian Football Harmony Cup

Basketball

- FIBA Oceania Championship
- FIBA Oceania Women's Championship

Badminton

- Oceania Badminton Championships

Baseball

- Oceania Baseball Championship

Bowling

- Asia Pacific Bowls Championships

Boxing

- Oceania Amateur Boxing Championships

Chess

- Oceania Chess Championship

Cricket

- ICC EAP Cricket Trophy
- ICC EAP Cricket Trophy (One day)

Cross country running

- Oceania Cross Country Championships

Curling

- Pacific-Asia Curling Championships
- Pacific-Asia Junior Curling Championships

Cycling

- Oceania Road Cycling Championships

Diving

- Oceania Diving Championships

Field hockey

- Men's Oceania Cup
- Women's Oceania Cup

Fistball

- Asia-Pacific Fistball Championships

Football and beach soccer

- OFC Men's Nations Cup
- OFC Men's Champions League
- OFC Women's Nations Cup
- OFC Women's Champions League
- OFC Youth Development Tournament
- OFC U-19 Championship
- OFC U-16 Championship
- OFC U-19 Women's Championship
- OFC U-16 Women's Championship
- OFC Beach Soccer Nations Cup

Futsal

- OFC Futsal Nations Cup
- OFC Futsal Men's Champions League
- OFC Futsal Women's Nations Cup

Handball and beach handball

- Oceania Handball Champions Cup
- Oceania Handball Nations Cup
- Oceania Beach Handball Championship

Lacrosse

- Asia Pacific Lacrosse Championship

Motorsport

- Asia-Pacific Rally Championship
- Asia-Pacific Touring Car Championship

Racewalking

- Oceania Race Walking Championships

Sailing

- 49er & 49er FX Oceania Championships

Shooting

- Oceania Shooting Championships

Swimming

- Oceania Swimming Championships

Table tennis

- Oceania Table Tennis Championships

== See also ==
- Pacific Games, a multi-sport event between competitors from all nations in Oceania
- Championship
- World championship
  - African Championship
  - Asian Championship
  - European Championship
    - European Junior Championships (disambiguation)
  - Pan American Championship
    - Central American Championships (disambiguation)
    - North American Championship
      - Canadian Championships
    - South American Championship
