= African Championship =

An African Championship is a top level international sports competition between African athletes or sports teams representing their respective countries or professional sports clubs.

== List of championships ==
Athletics

- African Championships in Athletics
- African Junior Athletics Championships
- African Youth Athletics Championships
- African Cross Country Championships
- African Marathon Championships
- African Race Walking Championships
- African Combined Events Championships (decathlon and heptathlon)
- African Triathlon Championships
- African Mountain Running Championships

Archery

- African Archery Championships

Badminton

- African Badminton Championships

Basketball

- FIBA Africa Championship
- AfroCan
- AfroBasket Women
- FIBA 3x3 Africa Cup
- FIBA Africa Under-20 Championship
- FIBA Africa Under-18 Championship
- FIBA Africa Under-16 Championship
- FIBA Africa Under-20 Championship for Women
- FIBA Africa Under-18 Championship for Women
- FIBA Africa Under-16 Championship for Women

Baseball

- Baseball5 African Championship

Boxing

- African Amateur Boxing Championships

BMX racing

- African BMX Racing Championships

Chess

- African Chess Championship
- African Junior Chess Championship

Cricket

- ICC Africa Twenty20 Championship
- ICC Africa Women's Twenty20 Championship
- ICC Africa Under-19 Championship

Cycling

- African Road Championships

Draughts

- Draughts African Championship

Fencing

- African Fencing Championships

Field hockey

- Men's Hockey Africa Cup of Nations
- Women's Hockey Africa Cup of Nations

Football and beach soccer

- Africa Cup of Nations
- Women's Africa Cup of Nations
- African Nations Championship
- CAF U-23 Championship
- African Youth Championship
- African U-17 Championship
- African U-20 Women's World Cup qualification
- African U-17 Women's World Cup qualification
- Beach Soccer Africa Cup of Nations
- African Minifootball Cup

Futsal

- Futsal Africa Cup of Nations
- Women's Futsal Africa Cup of Nations

Gymnastics

- African Artistic Gymnastics Championships
- African Rhythmic Gymnastics Championships
- Aerobic Gymnastics African Championships

Korfball

- All-Africa Korfball Championship

Handball

- African Men's Handball Championship
- African Women's Handball Championship

Hockey

- Indoor Africa Cup

Judo

- African Judo Championships

Motorsport

- African Rally Championship

Mountain biking

- African Mountain Bike Championships

Muaythai

- African Muaythai Championships

Netball

- Africa Netball Cup

Rally

- African Rally Championship

Roller hockey

- Roller Hockey African Championship

Rowing

- African Rowing Championships

Rugby

- Rugby Africa Cup
- Rugby Africa Women's Cup
- Africa Men's Sevens
- Africa Women's Sevens

Sambo

- African Sambo Championships

Shooting

- IPSC African Handgun Championship

Snooker

- ABSC All Africa Snooker Championships

Swimming

- African Swimming Championships
- African Junior Swimming Championships
- African Masters Aquatics Championships
- African Zone Swimming Championships

Table tennis

- African Table Tennis Championships

Taekwondo

- African Taekwondo Championships

Volleyball

- Men's African Volleyball Championship
- Women's African Volleyball Championship
- African Beach Volleyball Championships
- Men's U23 African Volleyball Championship
- Women's U23 African Volleyball Championship
- Men's U21 African Volleyball Championship
- Women's Africa Volleyball Championship U20
- Men's U19 African Volleyball Championship
- Girls' Africa Volleyball Championship U18

Weightlifting

- African Weightlifting Championships

Wrestling

- African Wrestling Championships

== See also ==
- African Games, a multi-sport event between competitors from all nations in Africa
- Championship
- World championship
  - Asian Championship
  - European Championship
    - European Junior Championships (disambiguation)
  - Oceania Championship
  - Pan American Championship
    - Central American Championships (disambiguation)
    - North American Championship
      - Canadian Championships
    - South American Championship
