= European Masters =

European Masters may refer to:

In Sports:

- Omega European Masters, a golf tournament
- European Masters (curling)
- European Masters (snooker), annual world ranking snooker tournament that takes place on the European continent
- European Masters Swimming Championships
- EHF European Masters Handball Championship
- European Masters Athletics Championships
- European Masters Athletics Championships Non-Stadia
- European Masters Games, a quadrennial multi-sport summer event
- European Young Masters (golf)
- European Senior Masters (disambiguation)

In Education:

- Master's degree in Europe
- European Master post-graduate degree
- European Master in Management
- European Master on Software Engineering
- European Master's in Translation
- European Master's Programme in Human Rights and Democratisation (EMA)
- Higher Education European Masters

== See also ==
- Master of European Law
- Master of European Design
- European Bowling Tour Masters
- European Championship (disambiguation)
- European Open (disambiguation)
