= Pétanque World Championships =

Premier world pétanque competition between national pétanque organisations

Tournament information
- Sport: Pétanque
- Location: Various
- Established: 1959 (men); 1988 (women)
- Administrator: FIPJP
- Website: F.I.P.J.P

The Pétanque World Championships are international pétanque competitions organized by the Fédération internationale de pétanque et jeu provençal (French for 'International Federation of Pétanque and Provençal Game', FIPJP).

== Overview ==
The FIPJP Men's Triples World Championships were first held in 1959 in Spa, Belgium. Additional championship categories were subsequently added for young people (jeunes), women, and for precision shooting (tir de precision). In 2015, a Singles World Championship was added.

Currently, Men's Triples Championships and the Precision Shooting World Championships are held every other year in even-numbered years. Women's and Youth Championships, along with Men's Doubles, Women's Doubles, and Mixed Doubles, are held in odd-numbered years.

Pétanque is an official sport in several multisports competitions: World Games, Mediterranean Games, SEA Games, Asian Games, Pacific Games, Indian Ocean Games, African Games and World Beach Games.

The four top nations are France, Thailand, Belgium and Madagascar as per total world medal in 2018.

Championships scheduled to take place in Tahiti in 2014 were cancelled due to concern about the ebola epidemic.

=== Categories of championship ===
Current categories for Pétanque World Championships are :

- Individual (individuel or tête à tête) for men, women and juniors
- Doublet (doublette) for men, women and mixed doubles
- Triplet (triplette) for men, women and juniors
- Precision shooting (tir de precision) for men, women and juniors

=== History ===
FIPJP was founded on March 8, 1958, in Marseille, France, with seven member countries: Belgium, France, Morocco, Monaco, Switzerland, Tunisia and Spain. In 1959, the first Men's Triplet Championships were held in Spa, Belgium. Originally held yearly, the event has been held every other year since 2008. World Championship were not held in 1960, 1962, 1967, 1968, 1969 and 1970 due to managerial problems within the organisation.

In 1987, the first Youth Triplet Championship was held in Hasselt, Belgium. In 1988, the first Women's Triplet Championship was held in Palma de Mallorca, Spain. Starting in 1996, triplet teams are permitted to feature four players allowing the replacement of one player in any game.

In 2000, the first Men's Precision Shooting Championship was added to the Men's Triplet Championship held in São Brás de Alportel, Portugal. In 2001, the first Youth Precision Shooting Championship was added to the Youth Triplet Championship held in Lons-le-Saunier, France. In 2002, the first Women's Precision Shooting Championship was added to the Women's Triplet Championship held in La Tuque, Canada.

== Men's/Open Triplet World Championships medalists ==
Year	Location	Gold	Silver	Bronze
1959	(Belgium) Spa	France; François De Souza; Marcel Marcou; Fernand-André Maraval	Tunisia; Ayadi; Charad; Perchichi	France; Martel; Chabaud; Scivicco
1961	(France) Cannes	France; François De Souza; Marcel Marcou; Fernand-André Maraval	Spain; Macario Navarro; Antonio Fernández; Francisco Arribas	France; Milero; Etienne Musso; Iréné Merentier
1963	(Morocco) Casablanca	France; François De Souza; Marcel Marcou; Fernand-André Maraval	Morocco; Jidhal Mathani; José Pacifico; Tony Sanchez	Morocco; Mahmoud Archane; Iffelahen Slimane; Belhaj Eladaoui
1964	(Switzerland) Geneva	Algeria; Boualem Ghorab; Ahmed Sennia; Ahmed Farreh	Morocco; Kouider; Longo; Haller	Switzerland; Dehuaz; Lello; Marro
1965	(Spain) Madrid	Switzerland; Maurice Evequoz; Jo Ferraud; Christian Theiler	Spain; Jorge Martinez; Diego López Zarza; Francisco Franco	France; François Melis; Jean Paon; Marcel Samito
1966	(Spain) Palma	Switzerland; Maurice Evequoz; Jo Ferraud; Christian Theiler	Monaco; Bellone; Michel; Nigioni	Spain; Juan Cardenal; Bernardo Cardenal; Agustín Del Pino
1971	(France) Nice	Spain; Juan Cardenal; Agustín Del Pino; Miguel García	Belgium; Michèle Decerf-Peelen; Claude Peelen; Bruno Somacal	France; Jean Paon; Robert Lebeau; Tiburce Mattei
1972	(Switzerland) Geneva	France; Jean Paon; Robert Lebeau; Tiburce Mattei	Tunisia; Mohamed Ferdani; Becchiz Dormek; Ben-Amida Maatallah	France; Robert Méléro; Etienne Musso; Iréné Merentier
1973	(Morocco) Casablanca	Switzerland; Daniel Baldo; Pierre Haraz; Michel Vuignier	France; Claude Catusse; René Sénezergues; Christian Lafon	France; M'Barek Anzit; Gérard Pariset; Georges Simoes
1974	(Spain) Alicante	France; José Garcia; René Morales; Jean Kokoyan	Monaco; Cornutello; Cornutello; Enza	Belgium; P. Parnagiotou; W. Pecriaux; A. Vassart
1975	(Canada) Québec	Italy; Mario Carioli; Salvatore Pau; Giovanni Serando	France; José Garcia; René Morales; Jean Kokoyan	France; Marcel Caleca; Tony Caleca; Jean-Pierre Fritsch
1976	Monaco	France; Claude Calenzo; René Luchesi; Serge Rouviere	Monaco; Cornutello; Cornutello; Bernard Bandoli	Tunisia; Ferjani; Ouelbani; Taquez
1977	Luxembourg	France; Claude Calenzo; René Luchesi; Serge Rouviere	France; Gérard Naudo; Jean Naudo; François Gouges	France; Ange Arcalao; Raymond Frescura; Elie Tini
1978	(Belgium) Mons	Italy; Franco Ferro; Antonio Napolitano; Giovanni Serando	Monaco; Raymond Clapier; R. Martine; A. Menghini	France; Jean Paon; Robert Lebeau; Tiburce Mattei
1979	(United Kingdom) Southampton	Italy; Franco Ferro; Antonio Napolitano; Giovanni Serando	Monaco; Sobrero; Jean-Marie Cornutello; Sobrero	France; Claude Calenzo; René Luchesi; Serge Rouviere
1980	(France) Nevers	Switzerland; Jean Camélique; Eric Franzin; Antoine Savio	Spain; Fernando Ortiz; Ernesto Jerraz; Eleucino López	Italy; Casagrande; Zanelli; Sacco
1981	(Belgium) Ghent	Belgium; Christian Berg; Alain Hemon; Christian Hemon	Tunisia; Jabeur; Maatalah; Jendoubi	Tunisia; Kaddour; Ferdjan; Lakili
1982	(Switzerland) Geneva	Monaco; Bernard Bandoli; Raymond Clapier; Jean-Marie Cornutello	Madagascar; Semplice Andrianomentsoa; Anicet Andriamalala; Bien-Aimé Clément Andriamalala	Switzerland; Afro Colombani; Pierre Heritier; Roland Nicolet
1983	(Tunisia) Tunis	Tunisia; Matallah Ben Hamida; Mohamed Ferjani; Hédi Jabeur	Belgium; Gérard Lafontan; Patrick Mertens; Guy Simon	Spain; Antonio Castellanos; Francisco Roig; Juan Antonio Roig
1984	(Netherlands) Rotterdam	Morocco; Hafid Alaoui; Kouider; Ahmad Safri	Algeria; Abdellak Boufkeda; Malik Kerdjou; Karim Sennia	France; Daniel Dejean; Jean-Michel Ferrand; Jean-Claude Lagarde
1985	(Morocco) Casablanca	France; Alain Bideaui; Didier Choupay; Patrick Lopeze	Monaco; Raymond Clapier; Raphaël Di Siervi; Ernest Gazzo	Italy; Luigi Casagrande; Riciotti Sacco; Amélio Zunino
1986	(France) Épinal	Tunisia; Allala Jendoubi; Abderraouf Lakili; Tarak Lakili	Morocco; Hafid Alaoui; Aziz Hammouchen; Ahmad Safri	Algeria; Brahim Boukemiche; Mourah Fetis; Karim Sennia
1987	(Algeria) Boumerdès	Morocco; Hafid Alaoui; Aziz Hammouchen; Ahmad Safri	Morocco; Abdellatif Laouja; Mohamed El Ouadi; Amal Moufid	Tunisia; Amar Bedjaoui; Mohamed Ferdjani; Fethi Ouechtati
1988	(Italy) Genoa	France; Didier Choupay; Christian Fazzino; Daniel Voisin	Morocco; Hafid Alaoui; Ahmad Safri; Amal Moufid	France; Jean-Marc Foyot; Serge Lapietra; René Luchesi
1989	(Spain) Pineda de Mar	France; Didier Choupay; Christian Fazzino; Daniel Voisin	Morocco; Hafid Alaoui; Elouadi; Abdellatif Laouija	Spain; Francisco Asensi; Agustín Hernández; Meshas Fetha
1990	Monaco	Morocco; Hafid Alaoui; Abdellatif Laouija; Amal Moufid	France; Roger Marco; Roger Marigot; Georges Simoes	France; Patrick Milcos; Philippe Quintais; Jean-Pierre Wattiez
1991	(Andorra) Escaldes–Engordany	France; Philippe Quintais; Michel Schatz; Georges Simoes	Thailand; Narong Kanjanakij; Amnat Sukkavatana; Thanee Noppalai	France; Daniel Voisin; Christian Fazzino; Didier Choupay
1992	(Italy) Aosta	France; Christian Fazzino; Jean-Marc Foyot; Daniel Monard	France; Philippe Quintais; Michel Schatz; Georges Simoes	Belgium; Michel Van Campenhout; Alain Van Caeneghem; Charles Weibel
1993	(Thailand) Chiang Mai	France; Philippe Quintais; Michel Schatz; Georges Simoes	France; Michel Briand; David Ledantec; Michel Loy	Algeria; Mohamed Belabib; Rachid Fekir; Ahmed Zeboudi
1994	(France) Clermont-Ferrand	France; Alain Bideau; Didier Choupay; Michel Loy	Belgium; Joël Marchandise; Michel Van Campenhout; Charles Weibel	France; Michel Briand; Christian Fazzino; Jean-Marc Foyot
1995	(Belgium) Brussels	France; David Le Dantec; Philippe Quintais; Philippe Suchaud	France; Christian Fazzino; Michel Schartz; Jean-Marc Foyot	Morocco; Hafid Alaoui; Amal Moufid; Ahmed Essafi
1996	(Germany) Essen	France; David Le Dantec; Philippe Quintais; Philippe Suchaud	Tunisia; Mohamed Ferjani; Khaled Lakhal; Amar Tayachi	France; Michel Briand; Michel Schatz; Jean-Marc Foyot
1997	(France) Montpellier	Tunisia; Abderraouf Lakili; Tarek Lakili; Khaled Lakhal	France; Michel Briand; Pascal Milei; Zvonko Radnic	France; Michel Loy; Philippe Quintais; Philippe Suchaud
1998	(Spain) Maspalomas	France; Michel Briand; Didier Choupay; Christian Fazzoni; Philippe Quintais	Morocco; Sad Adjani; Mafid Alaoui; Youssef Saissi; Youssef Seghir	Belgium; Jean-François Hémon; André Lozano; Michel Van Campenhout; Charles Weibel
1999	(France) Réunion	Madagascar; Christian Andriantseheno; Kalias Oukabay; Jean-Jacky Randrianandrasana	Belgium; André Lozano; Michel Van Campenhout; William Vanderbiest; Charles Weibel	France; David Le Dantec; Damien Hureau; Michel Loy; Philippe Suchaud
2000	(Portugal) São Brás de Alportel	Belgium; Jean-François Hemon; André Lozano; Michel Vancampenhout; Charles Weibel	Tunisia; Tarek Lakili; Khaled Lakhal; Lassâad El May	France; Philippe Quintais; Jean-Marc Foyot; Jean-Luc Robert; Philippe Suchaud
2001	Monaco	France; Henri Lacroix; Philippe Quintais; Éric Sirot; Philippe Suchaud	Tunisia; Tarek Lakili; Khaled Lakhal; Mohamed Ferjani; K. Kahla	Belgium; Jean-Francois Hémon; André Lozano; Michel Van Campenhout; Charles Weibel
2002	(France) Grenoble	France; Henri Lacroix; Philippe Quintais; Éric Sirot; Philippe Suchaud	Morocco; Hafid Alaoui; Ouadi Elchmi; Rachid Habchi; Youssef Saissi	Thailand; Thaloengkiat Phusa-Ad; Niklum Vinai; Tasuti Yunki
2003	(Switzerland) Geneva	France; Henri Lacroix; Philippe Quintais; Éric Sirot; Philippe Suchaud	France; Damien Hureau; Bruno Le Boursicaud; Michel Loy; Bruno Rocher	Belgium; Serge Podor; Fabrice Uytheroeven; Michel Van Campenhout; Charles Weibel
2004	(France) Grenoble	France; Damien Hureau; Bruno Le Boursicaud; Michel Loy; Bruno Rocher	Belgium; Jean-Francois Hémon; Serge Podor; Michel Van Campenhout; Charles Weibel	Cambodia; Heng Tha; Chan Mean Sok; Sophom Yim
2004	(France) Grenoble	France; Damien Hureau; Bruno Le Boursicaud; Michel Loy; Bruno Rocher	Belgium; Jean-Francois Hémon; Serge Podor; Michel Van Campenhout; Charles Weibel	France; Henri Lacroix; Philippe Quintais; Éric Sirot; Philippe Suchaud
2005	(Belgium) Brussels	France; Simon Cortes; Henri Lacroix; Julien Lamour; Philippe Suchaud	Belgium; Jean-Francois Hémon; Serge Podor; Michel Van Campenhout; Charles Weibel	France; Damien Hureau; Bruno Le Boursicaud; Michel Loy; Bruno Rocher
2005	(Belgium) Brussels	France; Simon Cortes; Henri Lacroix; Julien Lamour; Philippe Suchaud	Belgium; Jean-Francois Hémon; Serge Podor; Michel Van Campenhout; Charles Weibel	Thailand; Thaloengkiat Phusa-Ad; Pakin Phukram; Ratana Siripong; Wanta Weerapong
2006	(France) Grenoble	France; Sylvain Dubreuil; Didier Chagneau; Michel Loy; Pascal Milei	Tunisia; Sami Atallah; Nabil El Bey; Khaled Lakhal; Mohamed Ferjani	Italy; Maurizio Biancotto; Fabio Dutto; Gianni Laigueglia; Simon Salto
2006	(France) Grenoble	France; Sylvain Dubreuil; Didier Chagneau; Michel Loy; Pascal Milei	Tunisia; Sami Atallah; Nabil El Bey; Khaled Lakhal; Mohamed Ferjani	Thailand; Thaloengkiat Phusa-Ad; Suksan Piachan; Yindeesab Somyos; Niklum Vinai
2007	(Thailand) Pattaya	France; Thierry Grandet; Henri Lacroix; Bruno Le Boursicaud; Philippe Suchaud	Madagascar; Patrick Maminirina; Mamod Jacky Dinmamod; Carlos Rakotoarivelo; Christian Andrianiaina	Italy; Ancotto; Luca Zocco; Fabio Dutto; Mariano Occelli
2007	(Thailand) Pattaya	France; Thierry Grandet; Henri Lacroix; Bruno Le Boursicaud; Philippe Suchaud	Madagascar; Patrick Maminirina; Mamod Jacky Dinmamod; Carlos Rakotoarivelo; Christian Andrianiaina	Tunisia; Med Nizar; Sami Atallah; Tharek Lakili; Khaled Lakhal
2008	(Senegal) Dakar	France; Thierry Grandet; Henri Lacroix; Bruno Le Boursicaud; Philippe Suchaud	Thailand; Pakin Phuram; Thaloengkiat Phusa-Ad; Suksan Piachan; Sarawut Sriboonpeng	France; Pascal Milei; Philippe Suchaud; Stéphane Robineau; Zvonko Radnic
2008	(Senegal) Dakar	France; Thierry Grandet; Henri Lacroix; Bruno Le Boursicaud; Philippe Suchaud	Thailand; Pakin Phuram; Thaloengkiat Phusa-Ad; Suksan Piachan; Sarawut Sriboonpeng	Belgium; Jean-Francois Hémon; Michael Masuy; Michel Van Campenhout; Charles Weibel
2010	(Turkey) İzmir	France; Thierry Grandet; Henri Lacroix; Bruno Le Boursicaud; Philippe Suchaud	Madagascar; David Randriamarohaja; Jean Marson Ratolojanahary; Tiana Laurens Razanadrakoto; Christian Andrianiaina	Mauritania; Mamadou Abdallahi; Ibrahim Ivakou; Hamoud Ethmane; Sidi Abdallah
2010	(Turkey) İzmir	France; Thierry Grandet; Henri Lacroix; Bruno Le Boursicaud; Philippe Suchaud	Madagascar; David Randriamarohaja; Jean Marson Ratolojanahary; Tiana Laurens Razanadrakoto; Christian Andrianiaina	Spain; Roberto Carlos López; David Sánchez; Javier Flores; Manuel H. Romero
2012	(France) Marseille	France; Henri Lacroix; Bruno Le Boursicaud; Philippe Suchaud; Dylan Rocher	Thailand; Thaloengkiat Phusa-Ad; Suksan Piachan; Sarawut Sriboonpeng; Supan Thongphoo	Belgium; Jean-Francois Hémon; André Lozano; Michel Van Campenhout; Charles Weibel
2012	(France) Marseille	France; Henri Lacroix; Bruno Le Boursicaud; Philippe Suchaud; Dylan Rocher	Thailand; Thaloengkiat Phusa-Ad; Suksan Piachan; Sarawut Sriboonpeng; Supan Thongphoo	Italy; Alessio Cocciolo; Fabio Dutto; Gianni Laigueglia; Diego Rizzi
2014	(France) Papeete	Cancelled due to concerns over the Western African Ebola virus epidemic		
2016	(Madagascar) Antananarivo	Madagascar; Tita Razakarisoa; Christian Andrianiaina; Hery Razafimahatra; Lova Rakotondrazafy	Benin; Alain Latedjou; Ronald Bottre; Marcel Bio; Régis Simba	France; Henri Lacroix; Bruno Le Boursicaud; Philippe Suchaud; Dylan Rocher
2016	(Madagascar) Antananarivo	Madagascar; Tita Razakarisoa; Christian Andrianiaina; Hery Razafimahatra; Lova Rakotondrazafy	Benin; Alain Latedjou; Ronald Bottre; Marcel Bio; Régis Simba	Belgium; Charles Weibel; André Lozano; Logan Baton; Jérémy Pardoen
2018	(Canada) Desbiens, Quebec	France; Henri Lacroix; Philippe Quintais; Philippe Suchaud; Dylan Rocher	Morocco; Hodoyfa Bouchgour; Hicham Boulassal; Abdessamad El Mankari; Mohamed Ajouad	Senegal; François N'Diaye; Insa Seck; Boubacar Samoua; Hussein Dakhla Ilah
2018	(Canada) Desbiens, Quebec	France; Henri Lacroix; Philippe Quintais; Philippe Suchaud; Dylan Rocher	Morocco; Hodoyfa Bouchgour; Hicham Boulassal; Abdessamad El Mankari; Mohamed Ajouad	Tunisia; Mohk Bougriba; Majdi Hammani; Sofien Ben Brahim; Samir Karoul
2020	(Switzerland) Lausanne	Postponed due to the COVID-19 pandemic		
2021	(Spain) Santa Susanna	France; Dylan Rocher; Henri Lacroix; Philippe Suchaud; Philippe Quintais	Spain; Javier Cardenas Villaverde; Alejandro Cardenas Villaverde; José Luis Guasch Orozco; Jesús Escacho Alarcón	Italy; Diego Rizzi; Andréa Chiapello; Alessio Cocciolo; Florian Cometto
2021	(Spain) Santa Susanna	France; Dylan Rocher; Henri Lacroix; Philippe Suchaud; Philippe Quintais	Spain; Javier Cardenas Villaverde; Alejandro Cardenas Villaverde; José Luis Guasch Orozco; Jesús Escacho Alarcón	Finland; Tuukka Ylönen; Olli Sinnemaa; Marko Jakonen; Miko Lehti
2023	(Benin) Cotonou	Thailand; Sarawut Sriboonpeng; Supan Thongphoo; Thanawan Toosewha; Ratchata Khamdee	Spain; Juan Carlos Mata; José Luis Guasch; Jesús Escacho; Sergi Rodríguez	France; Stéphane Robineau; Christophe Sarrio; Dylan Rocher; Mickaël Bonetto
2023	(Benin) Cotonou	Thailand; Sarawut Sriboonpeng; Supan Thongphoo; Thanawan Toosewha; Ratchata Khamdee	Spain; Juan Carlos Mata; José Luis Guasch; Jesús Escacho; Sergi Rodríguez	Burkina Faso; Moustapha Baguian; Boureima Ouédraogo; Ousmane Ouédraogo; Nestor Zoromé
2024	(France) Dijon	Italy; Andrea Chiapello; Alessio Cocciolo; Davide Lafore; Diego Rizzi	Madagascar; Faratiana Rakotoniaina; Jean-François Rakotondrainibé; Faly Donald Andrianantenaina; Christian Andriantseheno	Tunisia; Mohamed Khaled Bougriba; Majdi Hammami; Sofien Ben Brahim; Lassad El May
2024	(France) Dijon	Italy; Andrea Chiapello; Alessio Cocciolo; Davide Lafore; Diego Rizzi	Madagascar; Faratiana Rakotoniaina; Jean-François Rakotondrainibé; Faly Donald Andrianantenaina; Christian Andriantseheno	France; Jean Feltain; Henri Lacroix; Dylan Rocher; Philippe Suchaud

=== Men PRECISION SHOOTING (Tir de précision) ===
Men – Precision Shooting ( Tir de précision ) - Senior - Pétanque World Championships
Edition	Year	Place	GOLD Nation : Players	SILVER Nation : Players	BRONZE Nation : Players
16th	2024	Dijon, France	Madagascar : Jean-François Daniel Rakotondrainibé	Hungary: László Nagy	Spain : Jesús Escacho Mauritius: Parvez Khodabaccus
15th	2023	Cotonou, Benin	France : Dylan Rocher	Thailand: Ratchata Khamdee	Togo : Akolly Akollor Republic of the Congo: Fretas Maboundou
14th	2021	Santa Susanna, Spain	France : Dylan Rocher	Italy: RIZZI Diego	Spain : ESCACHO Jesús Turkey: ARSLANTAS Ibrahim
13th	2018	Desbiens, Canada	France : Dylan Rocher	Madagascar: RAKOTONINOSY Taratra	Morocco : BOULASSAL Hicham Italy: RIZZI Diego
12th	2016	Antananarivo, Madagascar	Cambodia: CHANMEAN Sok	France: LE BOURSICAUD Bruno	Thailand: SANGKAEW Thanakorn & Italy: RIZZI Diego
11th	2012	Marseille, France	France: LE BOURSICAUD Bruno	Ivory Coast: KOUANDE Adama	Malaysia: TEMIZI Ahmad & Cambodia: SIENG Vanna
10th	2010	İzmir, Turkey	France: LE BOURSICAUD Bruno	French Polynesia: MANEA Jean	Belgium: WEIBEL Claudy (world record 66 points) & Spain: LÓPEZ Roberto C.
9th	2008	Dakar, Senegal	Morocco: EL MENKARI Abdessamad	Senegal: N'DIAYE François	France: MILEI Pascal & Burkina Faso: BOUREIMA Ouadraogo
8th	2007	Pattaya, Thailand	Madagascar: RAKOTOARIVELO Sylvain Carlos	France: MILEI Pascal	Morocco: EL MENKARI Abdessamad & French Polynesia: MANEA Jean
7th	2006	Grenoble, France	Thailand: PHUSA-AD Thaleungkiat	Argentina: GUEVARA Néstor	Italy: LAIGUEGLIA Gianni & Tunisia : ATTALAH Sami
6th	2005	Brussels, Belgium	Thailand: PHUSA-AD Thaleungkiat	Benin: AGOSSA Gérard	Canada: POUPLOT Thomas & Senegal: N'DIAYE François
5th	2004	Grenoble, France	Tunisia: ATALLAH Sami	Benin: RANDRIANANDRASA Jean-Jacky	Benin: AGOSSA Gérard & PHUSA-AD Thaleungkiat
4th	2003	Geneva, Switzerland	France: QUINTAIS Philippe	Belgium: WEIBEL Claudy	Ivory Coast: KOUANDE Adama & Spain : GARCIA Sergio
3rd	2002	Grenoble, France	France: QUINTAIS Philippe (world record 62 points)	Madagascar: RANDRIANA Drasana	Belgium: WEIBEL Claudy & Luxembourg: VELESSE Gabriel
2nd	2001	Monaco	France: QUINTAIS Philippe	Senegal: N'DIAYE François	Belgium: WEIBEL Claudy & Morocco: MEQSOUD Hicham
1st	2000	São Brás de Alportel, Portugal	France: QUINTAIS Philippe	Belgium: WEIBEL Claudy	Mauritius:MURTHEN Naden & Madagascar: RAMAMINIRINA Patrik

The official World Record in Precision shooting is held by Christophe Sévilla with 67 points / 100 ( 3 July 2011 - Macon - France ).

The best performance non recognised by F.I.P.J.P is held by Dylan Rocher with 75 points / 100 ( Corsica - France).

==== Men SINGLES (Tête à Tête) ====
Year	Location	Gold	Silver	Bronze
2025	(Italy) Rome	Diego Rizzi (ITA)	Joseph Ramnointiaray (MAD)	Kees Koogje (NED); Muhamad Hafizuddin (MYS)
2023	(Benin) Cotonou	Ratchata Khamdee (THA)	Khaled Bougriba (TUN)	Sin Vong (CAM); Christophe Sarrio (FRA)
2022	(Denmark) Karlslunde	Jesús Escacho (ESP)	Diego Rizzi (ITA)	Maïky Molinas (SUI); Andre Lozano (BEL)
2019	(Spain) Almería	Maïky Molinas (SUI)	Henri Lacroix (FRA)	Franck Millo (MON); Thanakorn Sangkaew (THA)
2017	(Belgium) Ghent	Henri Lacroix (FRA)	Diego Rizzi (ITA)	Claudy Weibel (BEL) (Tunisia) Khaled Bougriba
2015	(France) Nice	Claudy Weibel (BEL)	(Tunisia) Sami Atallah (TUN)	Diego Rizzi (ITA); Abdessamad El Menkari (MAR)

=== Men DOUBLE (Doublette) ===
Year	Location	Gold	Silver	Bronze
2025	(Italy) Rome	Ratchata Khamdee (THA); Sarawut Sriboonpeng (THA)	Maïky Molinas (SUI); Joseph Molinas (SUI)	Joseph Ramnointiaray (MAD); Lova Rakotoarisoa (MAD)
2025	(Italy) Rome	Ratchata Khamdee (THA); Sarawut Sriboonpeng (THA)	Maïky Molinas (SUI); Joseph Molinas (SUI)	Diego Rizzi (ITA); Alessio Cocciolo (ITA)
2023	(Benin) Cotonou	Christophe Sarrio (FRA); Dylan Rocher (FRA)	Marcel Gbetable (BEN); Marcel Bio (BEN)	Sin Vong (CAM); Thong Chhoeun (CAM)
2023	(Benin) Cotonou	Christophe Sarrio (FRA); Dylan Rocher (FRA)	Marcel Gbetable (BEN); Marcel Bio (BEN)	Matthias Laukart (GER); Moritz Rosik (GER)
2022	(Denmark) Karlslunde	Diego Rizzi (ITA); Alessio Cocciolo (ITA)	Maïky Molinas (SUI); Joseph Molinas (SUI)	Khaled Bougriba (TUN); Sofien Ben Brahim (TUN)
2022	(Denmark) Karlslunde	Diego Rizzi (ITA); Alessio Cocciolo (ITA)	Maïky Molinas (SUI); Joseph Molinas (SUI)	Chandara Puth Yon (CAM); Vakhim Pheap (CAM)
2019	(Spain) Almería	Henri Lacroix (FRA); Philippe Suchaud (FRA)	Diego Rizzi (ITA); Alessio Cocciolo (ITA)	Assan Fabrice (CIV); Choaïb Maiga (CIV)
2019	(Spain) Almería	Henri Lacroix (FRA); Philippe Suchaud (FRA)	Diego Rizzi (ITA); Alessio Cocciolo (ITA)	Fanomezantsoa Ramarimanana (MAD); Urbain Ramanantiaray (MAD)
2017	(Belgium) Ghent	Henri Lacroix (FRA); Philippe Suchaud (FRA)	Sarawut Sriboonpeng (THA); Thanakorn Sangkaew (THA)	Claudy Weibel (BEL); Jean-François Hémon (BEL)
2017	(Belgium) Ghent	Henri Lacroix (FRA); Philippe Suchaud (FRA)	Sarawut Sriboonpeng (THA); Thanakorn Sangkaew (THA)	Moritz Rosik (GER); Raphael Gharany (GER)

=== Men MEDALS BY NATION – Pétanque World Championships ===
Men - Overall Medals - Pétanque World Championships -
Men MEDALS						Triple ( Triplette)				Precision Shooting ( Tir de précision )				Single ( Tête à tête )				Double ( Doublette )			
Rank	Nation	Gold	Silver	Bronze	Total	Gold	Silver	Bronze	Total	Gold	Silver	Bronze	Total	Gold	Silver	Bronze	Total	Gold	Silver	Bronze	Total
Nov. 2019	^{24}	^{66}	^{66}	^{94}	^{226}	^{48}	^{48}	^{58 (not always 2)}	^{154}	^{13}	^{13}	^{26}	^{52}	^{3}	^{3}	^{6}	^{12}	^{2}	^{2}	^{4}	^{8}
1	France	38	11	24	73	28	9	23	60	7	2	1	10	1	1	0	2	2	0	0	2
2	Switzerland	5	0	2	7	4	0	2	6	0	0	0	0	1	0	0	1	0	0	0	0
3	Morocco	4	9	7	20	3	9	3	15	1	0	3	4	0	0	1	1	0	0	0	0
4	Tunisia	4	8	7	19	3	7	5	15	1	0	1	2	0	1	1	2	0	0	0	0
5	Belgium	3	8	13	24	2	6	8	16	0	2	3	5	1	0	1	2	0	0	1	1
6	Madagascar	3	5	2	10	2	3	0	5	1	2	1	4	0	0	0	0	0	0	1	1
7	Italy	3	2	9	14	3	0	5	8	0	0	3	3	0	1	1	2	0	1	0	1
8	Thailand	2	4	6	12	0	3	3	6	2	0	2	4	0	0	1	1	0	1	0	1
9	Monaco	1	6	1	8	1	6	0	7	0	0	0	0	0	0	1	1	0	0	0	0
10	Spain	1	3	6	10	1	3	4	8	0	0	2	2	0	0	0	0	0	0	0	0
11	Algeria	1	1	2	4	1	1	2	4	0	0	0	0	0	0	0	0	0	0	0	0
12	Cambodia	1	0	2	3	0	0	1	1	1	0	1	2	0	0	0	0	0	0	0	0
13	Benin	0	3	1	4	0	1	0	1	0	2	1	3	0	0	0	0	0	0	0	0
14	Senegal	0	2	2	4	0	0	1	1	0	2	1	3	0	0	0	0	0	0	0	0
15	Ivory Coast	0	1	2	3	0	0	0	0	0	1	1	2	0	0	0	0	0	0	1	1
16	French Polynesia	0	1	1	2	0	0	0	0	0	1	1	2	0	0	0	0	0	0	0	0
17	Argentina	0	1	0	1	0	0	0	0	0	1	0	1	0	0	0	0	0	0	0	0
18	Burkina Faso	0	0	1	1	0	0	0	0	0	0	1	1	0	0	0	0	0	0	0	0
18	Canada	0	0	1	1	0	0	0	0	0	0	1	1	0	0	0	0	0	0	0	0
18	Germany	0	0	1	1	0	0	0	0	0	0	0	0	0	0	0	0	0	0	1	1
18	Luxemburg	0	0	1	1	0	0	0	0	0	0	1	1	0	0	0	0	0	0	0	0
18	Malaysia	0	0	1	1	0	0	0	0	0	0	1	1	0	0	0	0	0	0	0	0
18	Mauritania	0	0	1	1	0	0	1	1	0	0	0	0	0	0	0	0	0	0	0	0
18	Mauritius	0	0	1	1	0	0	0	0	0	0	1	1	0	0	0	0	0	0	0	0

=== WOMEN – Senior ===
==== Women TRIPLE (Triplette) ====
Women - Triple (Triplette) - Senior - Pétanque World Championships
Edition	Year	Place	GOLD Nation : Players	SILVER Nation : Players	BRONZE Nation : Players
20th	2025	Sin-le-Noble	Vietnam 2: Nguyễn Thị Thi; Nguyễn Thị Thúy Kiều; Lê Ngọc Như Ý Lại Thị Dung	Thailand: Thongsri Thamakord; Nantawan Fueangsanit; Kantaros Choochuay; Arisa Wadrongpak	Belgium: Nancy Barzin - Camille Max; Jessica Meskens - Madison Vleminckx & Cambodia: Un Sreya - Ouk Sreymom; Nop Chourlyka - Heang Vichny
19th	2023	Bangkok	Vietnam: Thạch Thị Ánh Lan; Kim Thị Thu Thảo; Trần Thị Diễm Trang; Trịnh Thị Kim Thanh	Thailand 1: Phantipha Wongchuvej; Nantawan Fueangsanit; Kantaros Choochuay; Pitchapa Suoi	France: Audrey Bandiera - Charlotte Darodes; Nelly Peyré - Cindy Peyrot & Thailand 2: Thongsri Thamakord - Srikam Sulaksana; Sunitra Phuangyoo - Jaysilak Tangudomphop
18th	2021	Santa Susanna	Thailand 1 : THAMAKORD Thongsri - WONGCHUVEJ Phantipha - FUEANGSANIT Nantawan - SUWANNAPHRUK Aumpawan	France : DARODES Charlotte - PEYROT Cindy - MAILLARD Anna - PICARD Emma	Thailand 2 : SUNITRA Phuangyoo - WANWIPA Dararat - CHEERAWAN Kallaya - LALITA Chiaochan & Tunisia : BEJI Mouna - BELLI Asma - HASSEN HADJ Ahlem - EP ISMAIL Ahlem Sassi
17th	2019	Phnom Penh	Thailand 1 : THAMAKORD Thongsri - WONGCHUVEJ Phantipha - FUEANGSANIT Nantawan - SUWANNAPHRUK Aumpawan	Laos : THEPPHAKAN Bilivak - VONGSAVATCH Chan - MANIVANH Souliya - SOUKSAVAT Khoun	France : MAILLARD Anna - BANDIERA Audrey - HERLEM Sandrine - FRIGARA Daisy & Cambodia : LENG Ke - SREYMOM Ouk - SREYA Un - SOVANNA Keo
16th	2017	Kaihua	France : MAILLARD Anna - COLOMBET / PAPON Angélique - DARODES Charlotte - BOURRIAUD Caroline	Madagascar Cicine-Mirana-Hasina-Tita	Italy : PETULICCHIO Valentina - ROMEO Vanessa - RATTENNI Jessica - SACCO Serena & Cambodia : LENG Ke - SREYMOM Ouk - SREYA Un - SORAKHIM Sreng
15th	2015	Bangkok	Spain : ROSARIA Ines - MATARRANZ Yolanda - Melanie HOMAR MAYOL - BLAZQUEZ Aurelia	Thailand : THAMAKORD Thongsri - WONGCHUVEJ Phantipha - FUEANGSANIT Nantawan - SUWANNAPHRUK Aumpawan	Thailand : PHUANGYOO Sunitra - YOOTHONG Nattaya - HIRANWONG Uraiwan - CHAISENA Sawitree Vietnam : Phan Thanh Phong - Le Hong Phuoc Vu -Khang Duy - Vo Tan Xuan
14th	2013	Montauban	Thailand 1 : THAMAKORD Thongsri - - WONGCHUVEJ Phantipha - SUWANNAPHRUK Aumpawan - FUANGSANIT Nantawan	France 2 : D’ISIDORO Ludivine - MAILLARD Anna - PAPON Angélique - VIREBAYRE Marie-Christine	Cambodia : LENG Ke - CHANTREA Oum - SREYMOM Ouk - SREYA Un & Canada : JOYAL Manon - RODRIGUE Marielle - DAIGLE Monique - BERGERON Marise
13th	2011	Kemer	Tunisia: BEJI Mouna - SAHAL Monia - BEN ABDESLEM Nadia - BELAID Saoussen	Thailand : THAMAKORD Thongsri - WONGCHUVEJ Phantipha - WONGSUT Suphannee - JAICHUN Sasithon	France : D’ISIDORO Ludivine - MAILLARD Anna - PAPON Angélique - VIREBAYRE Marie-Christine & Spain : INES Lizon - Yolanda MATARRANZ - GARCES Silvia, ROSARIO Ines
12th	2009	Suphanburi	Thailand : THAMAKORD Thongsri - WONGCHUVEJ Phantipha - WONGSUT Suphannee - JAICHUN Sasithon	France : MAILLARD Anna - BANDEIRAS Audrey - PAPON Angélique - VIREBAYRE Marie-Christine	Spain : BALLESTA Jeronima - ROSARIO Ines - MATARRANZ Yolanda - GARCES Silvia & Vietnam : Phan Thị Thúy Diễm - Phan Thị Ánh Hồng - Nguyễn Thị Trúc Mai - Nguyễn Thị Thi
11th	2008	Samsun	Spain : BALLESTA Jeronima - ROSARIO Ines - MATARRANZ Yolanda - GARCES Silvia	Thailand 1: SUJITTRA Chuamung - HANSUWAN Janjira - LIMWANICH Kannika - WONGSUT	France : KOUADRI Ranya - PAPON Angélique - SCHOPP Florence - VIREBAYRE Marie-Christine & Thailand 2 : YOUNGCHAM Noknoi - WONGCHUVEJ Phantipha - THAMAKORD Thongsri - KAMSAWAUNG Boonyoum
10th	2006	Grenoble	Thailand : YOUNGCHAM Noknoi - WONGCHUVEJ Phantipha - THAMAKORD Thongsri - KAMSAWAUNG Boonyoum	Tunisia: BEJI Mouna - SAHAL Monia - BEN ABDESLEM Nadia - BELAID Saoussen	France : KOUADRI Ranya - PAPON Angélique - SCHOPP Florence - VIREBAYRE Marie-Christine & Sweden : LARSSON Lotta - KÖHALMI Emma - BOSTRÖM Matilda - JOHANSSON Jessica
9th	2004	Maspalomas	Thailand : YOUNGCHAM Noknoi - WONGCHUVEJ Phantipha - THAMAKORD Thongsri - KAMSAWAUNG Boonyoum	Germany : EBLE Lara - HESS Annick - DETERDING Gudrun - THELEM Daniela	Israel SHRIKI Gali - RACHMONI Esther - OSSI Margalit - SIRI Sivan & Switzerland : ALTHAUS Corinne - MUFALE Precscilia - MAITRE Ludivine - POGET-RIZZADI Nathalie
8th	2002	La Tuque	Spain : BALLESTA Jeronima - DIAZ Maria-José - MATARRANZ Yolanda - PERES Maria	Thailand : YOUNGCHAM Noknoi -WARAPORN Mammad - THAMAKORD Thongsri - LERTWISETKAEW Yanin'	Morocco : BERNOUSSI Asmaa - OUABA Latifa - KHOUBANE Ouissai - FAHMI Hajar
7th	2000	Hyères	Belgium : BARZIN Nancy - BERDOYES Fabienne - GOBLET Linda - ODENNA Henriette	Denmark : POLSEN Sonja - KRAMER Susanne - KAABERBEL Lene - HANSEN Tine	Spain : DIAZ Maria-José - MATARRANZ Yolanda - PERES Maria-José - RUIZ Marisa
6th	1998	Stockholm	Spain : BALLESTA Jeronima - MAYOL Catalina - PASTOR Rosario - ROSARIO Ines	France : COLOMBET (PAPON) Angélique - DOLE Aline - KOUADRI Ranya - MILEI Peggy	Belgium : BARZIN Nancy - BERDOYES Fabienne - GOBLET Linda - HERIN Claude
5th	1996	Pori	Spain : BALLESTA Jeronima - MAYOL Catalina - PATERNA Maria - ROSARIO Ines	France : GELIN Nathalie - INNOCENTI Sylvette - MOULIN Michèle	Madagascar : RAJAONA Volana - RANOROSOA Simone - RANDIRANSOLO Bella - RAVOJA Minotiana
4th	1994	Luxemburg	France : GELIN Nathalie - INNOCENTI Sylvette - MOULIN Michèle	Canada : BERNARD Charlotte - COULOMB Sonia - BERNARD Charlotte	Madagascar : RANDRIANASOA Hantarivah - RAKOTONNIAINA Annie-R. - RANDRIANTENAINA Francine
3rd	1992	Lausanne	France : VIREBAYRE Marie-Christine - KOUADRI Ranya - DOLE Aline	Thailand 2: PAIRAT Meesab -VARAPORN Somjitprasert - THAMAKORD Thongsri'	Thailand 1: CHANSONG Boonyom - PEANGREE Thongkam - TOSSAPONG Pheatchabat
2nd	1990	Bangkok	Thailand 2: PAIRAT Meesab -VARAPORN Somjitprasert - THAMAKORD Thongsri	France : DOLE Aline - INNOCENTI Sylvette - KOUADRI Ranya	Thailand 1: JARUDACHA Viva - SOMSAKUL Wongden - TANACHAISITTIKUL Valie
1st	1988	Palma	Thailand 2: PAIRAT Meesab -VARAPORN Somjitprasert - THAMAKORD Thongsri	Sweden : ERIKSSON Christel - LARSSON Lotta - DAVIDSSON Maria	Canada : MORIN Lyne - SAINT LOUIS Marie-Paule - BERNARD Charlotte

==== Women PRECISION SHOOTING (Tir de précision) ====
Women - Precision Shooting ( Tir de précision ) - Senior - Pétanque World Championships
Edition	Year	Place	GOLD Nation : Players	SILVER Nation : Players	BRONZE Nation : Players
13th	2025	Sin-le-Noble, France	Thailand : Kantaros Choochuay	Spain : Sara Díaz	Turkey : Yağmur Tosun & Norway: Ranu Homniam
12th	2023	Bangkok, Thailand	Myanmar : Khin Cherry Thet	Vietnam : Thạch Thị Ánh Lan	Thailand : Kantaros Choochuay & Laos: Bovilak Thepphakan
11th	2021	Santa Susanna, Spain	Cambodia: SREYMOM Ouk	Thailand: THAMAKORD Thongsri	France: PICARD Emma & Norway: HOMNIAM Ranu
10th	2019	Phnom Penh, Cambodia	Cambodia : KE Leng	Laos : THEPPHAKAN Bilivak	China : WANG Yan Jing & Myanmar KHIN Cherry Thet
9th	2017	Kaihua, China	Cambodia : KE Leng	Thailand : Phantipha Wongchuvej	Germany BEIL Luzia & Turkey CAPTULU Hilal
8th	2015	Bangkok, Thailand	Cambodia : KE Leng	Tunisia: BEJI Mouna	Madagascar : RANDRIAMANDRISOA Josepha & France : BANDEIRAS Audrey
7th	2013	Montauban, France	Cambodia : KE Leng	Tunisia : BEJI Mouna	Madagascar : RANDRIAMANDRISOA Josepha & Germany HESS Muriel
6th	2011	Kemer, Turkey	Madagascar : RANDRIAMBAHINY Hanta Francine	Canada : BERGERON Maryse	France : PAPON Angélique & England. : HUNTLEY Sarah
5th	2009	Suphanburi, Thailand	France : PAPON Angélique	Spain : ROSARIA Inez	Canada : BERGERON Maryse & Thailand : Phantipha Wongchuvej
4th	2007	Samsun, Turkey	France : PAPON Angélique	Netherlands : RUDOLFS Karin	Thailand : THAMAKORD Thongsri & Tunisia : BEJI Mouna
3rd	2006	Grenoble, France	France : PAPON Angélique	Thailand : THAMAKORD Thongsri	England. : WEBB Vanessa & Netherlands : RUDOLFS Karin
2nd	2004	Maspalomas, Spain	Thailand : THAMAKORD Thongsri (record 49 pts)	Canada : BERGERON Maryse	Spain : ROSARIA Ines & Israel : OSSI Margalit
1st	2002	La Tuque, Canada	Spain : MATTARANZ Yolanda	Sweden : CARLSSON Eva	Canada : BERGERON Maryse & France : QUENNEHEN Cynthia (record 48 pts)

==== Women SINGLES (Tête à Tête) ====
Year	Location	Gold	Silver	Bronze
2025	(Italy) Rome	Kantaros Choochuay (THA)	Nelly Peyré (FRA)	Gidgia Aït Idir (ALG); Madison Schollaert (BEL)
2023	(Benin) Cotonou	Mouna Béji (TUN)	Gidgia Aït Idir (ALG)	Ouk Sreymom (CAM); Nelly Peyré (FRA)
2022	(Denmark) Karlslunde	Sylviane Metairon (SUI)	Ranu Homniam (NOR)	Phantipha Wongchuvej (THA); Nur Ain Syuhada (MAS)
2019	(Spain) Almería	Charlotte Darodes (FRA)	Phantipha Wongchuvej (THA)	Mouna Béji (TUN); Jessica Meskens (BEL)
2017	(Belgium) Ghent	Ouk Sreymom (CAM)	Mouna Béji (TUN)	Audrey Bandiera (FRA); Phantipha Wongchuvej (THA)
2015	(France) Nice	Yolanda Matarranz (ESP)	Nantawan Fueangsanit (THA)	Jessica Johansson (SWE); Camille Max (BEL)

==== Women DOUBLE (Doublette) ====
Year	Location	Gold	Silver	Bronze
2025	(Italy) Rome	Kantaros Choochuay (THA); Nantawan Fueangsanit (THA)	Nelly Peyré (FRA); Audrey Bandiera (FRA)	Lalatiana Nirnaiaina (MAD); Nomenjanahry Ravomanana (MAD)
2025	(Italy) Rome	Kantaros Choochuay (THA); Nantawan Fueangsanit (THA)	Nelly Peyré (FRA); Audrey Bandiera (FRA)	Ouk Sreymom (CAM); Un Sreya (CAM)
2023	(Benin) Cotonou	Nantawan Fueangsanit (THA); Sunitra Phuangyoo (THA)	Nelly Peyré (FRA); Audrey Bandiera (FRA)	Gidgia Aït Idir (ALG); Nadia Djabri (ALG)
2023	(Benin) Cotonou	Nantawan Fueangsanit (THA); Sunitra Phuangyoo (THA)	Nelly Peyré (FRA); Audrey Bandiera (FRA)	Sara Díaz (ESP); Aure Blázquez (ESP)
2022	(Denmark) Karlslunde	Aure Blázquez (ESP); Sara Díaz (ESP)	Nur Ain Syuhada (MAS); Nur Thahira Tasnim (MAS)	Vanessa Romeo (ITA); Valentina Petuliccio (ITA)
2022	(Denmark) Karlslunde	Aure Blázquez (ESP); Sara Díaz (ESP)	Nur Ain Syuhada (MAS); Nur Thahira Tasnim (MAS)	Verena Gabe (GER); Eileen Jenal (GER)
2019	(Spain) Almería	Phantipha Wongchuvej (THA); Nantawan Fueangsanit (THA)	Jessica Johansson (SWE); Matilda Boström (SWE)	Charlotte Darodes (FRA); Angélique Colombet (FRA)
2019	(Spain) Almería	Phantipha Wongchuvej (THA); Nantawan Fueangsanit (THA)	Jessica Johansson (SWE); Matilda Boström (SWE)	Maryse Bergeron (CAN); Kassandra Dufresne (CAN)
2017	(Belgium) Ghent	Phantipha Wongchuvej (THA); Nantawan Fueangsanit (THA)	Camille Max (BEL); Nancy Barzin (BEL)	Angélique Papon (FRA); Audrey Bandiera (FRA)
2017	(Belgium) Ghent	Phantipha Wongchuvej (THA); Nantawan Fueangsanit (THA)	Camille Max (BEL); Nancy Barzin (BEL)	Rosario Inés (ESP); Melani Homar (ESP)

==== Women MEDALS BY NATION - Pétanque World Championships ====
Women - Overall Medals - Pétanque World Championships -
Women MEDALS						Triple ( Triplette)				Precision Shooting ( Tir de précision )				Single ( Tête à tête )				Double ( Doublette )			
Rank	Nation	Gold	Silver	Bronze	Total	Gold	Silver	Bronze	Total	Gold	Silver	Bronze	Total	Gold	Silver	Bronze	Total	Gold	Silver	Bronze	Total
	^{22}	^{24}	^{24}	^{40}	^{88}	^{17}	^{17}	^{26 (not always 2)}	^{59}	^{10}	^{10}	^{20}	^{40}	^{3}	^{3}	^{6}	^{12}	^{2}	^{2}	^{4}	^{8}
1	Thailand	10	11	8	29	8	5	5	18	1	3	2	6	-	2	1	3	1	1	-	2
2	France	7	6	11	24	3	6	4	13	3	-	4	7	1	-	1	2	-	-	2	2
3	Spain	7	1	5	13	5	-	3	8	1	1	1	3	1	-	-	1	-	-	1	1
4	Cambodia	6	-	3	9	-	-	3	3	5	-	-	5	1	-	-	1	-	-	-	0
5	Tunisia	1	4	2	7	1	1	1	3	-	2	1	3	-	1	1	2	-	-	-	0
6	Madagascar	1	1	4	6	-	1	2	3	1	-	2	3	-	-	-	0	-	-	-	0
7	Belgium	1	1	3	5	1	-	1	2	-	-	-	0	-	-	2	2	1	-	-	1
8	Canada	-	3	5	8	-	1	2	3	-	2	2	4	-	-	-	0	-	-	1	1
9	Sweden	-	2	3	5	-	1	1	2	-	1	-	1	-	-	1	1	-	1	-	1
10	Laos	-	2	-	2	-	1	-	1	-	1	-	1	-	-	-	0	-	-	-	0
11	Germany	-	1	2	3	-	1	-	1	-	-	2	2	-	-	-	0	-	-	-	0
12	Netherlands	-	1	1	2	-	-	-	0	-	1	1	2	-	-	-	0	-	-	-	0
13	Denmark	-	1	-	1	-	1	-	1	-	-	-	0	-	-	-	0	-	-	-	0
14	England.	-	-	2	2	-	-	-	0	-	-	2	2	-	-	-	0	-	-	-	0
14	Israel	-	-	2	2	-	-	1	1	-	-	1	1	-	-	-	0	-	-	-	0
14	Vietnam	-	-	2	2	-	-	2	2	-	-	-	0	-	-	-	0	-	-	-	0
15	China	-	-	1	1	-	-	-	0	-	-	1	1	-	-	-	0	-	-	-	0
15	Italy	-	-	1	1	-	-	1	1	-	-	-	0	-	-	-	0	-	-	-	0
15	Morocco	-	-	1	1	-	-	1	1	-	-	-	0	-	-	-	0	-	-	-	0
15	Myanmar	-	-	1	1	-	-	-	0	-	-	1	1	-	-	-	0	-	-	-	0
15	Switzerland	-	-	1	1	-	-	1	1	-	-	-	0	-	-	-	0	-	-	-	0
15	Norway	-	-	1	1	-	-	-	0	-	-	1	1	-	-	-	0	-	-	-	0

=== MIXED – Senior ===
==== Mixed Double (Doublette mixte ) ====
Year	Location	Gold	Silver	Bronze
2025	(Italy) Rome	Nomenjanahry Ravomanana (MAD); Lora Rakotoarisoa (MAD)	Audrey Bandiera (FRA); Dylan Rocher (FRA)	Sarawut Sriboonpeng (THA); Nantawan Fueangsanit (THA)
2025	(Italy) Rome	Nomenjanahry Ravomanana (MAD); Lora Rakotoarisoa (MAD)	Audrey Bandiera (FRA); Dylan Rocher (FRA)	Caroline Godard (MON); Vincent Fernandez (MON)
2023	(Benin) Cotonou	Laïma Sambo (BEN); Marcel Gbetable (BEN)	Audrey Bandiera (FRA); Dylan Rocher (FRA)	Alliance Ramdé (BFA); Boureima Ouédraogo (BFA)
2023	(Benin) Cotonou	Laïma Sambo (BEN); Marcel Gbetable (BEN)	Audrey Bandiera (FRA); Dylan Rocher (FRA)	Nantawan Fueangsanit (THA); Sarawut Sriboonpeng (THA)
2022	(Denmark) Karlslunde	Sarawut Sriboonpeng (THA); Nantawan Fueangsanit (THA)	Javier Cárdenas (ESP); Sara Díaz (ESP)	Anders Erlandsen (DEN); Katrine Junge Olsen (DEN)
2022	(Denmark) Karlslunde	Sarawut Sriboonpeng (THA); Nantawan Fueangsanit (THA)	Javier Cárdenas (ESP); Sara Díaz (ESP)	Vincent Ferrandez (MON); Caroline Godard (MON)
2019	(Spain) Almería	Sarawut Sriboonpeng (THA); Nantawan Fueangsanit (THA)	Philippe Suchaud (FRA); Angélique Colombet (FRA)	Joël Marchandise (BEL); Nancy Barzin (BEL)
2019	(Spain) Almería	Sarawut Sriboonpeng (THA); Nantawan Fueangsanit (THA)	Philippe Suchaud (FRA); Angélique Colombet (FRA)	Eric Motté (MON); Anne della Pietra (MON)
2017	(Belgium) Ghent	Majdi Hammami (TUN); Asma El-Belli (TUN)	Nhem Bora (CAM); Sreng Sorakhim (CAM)	Syed Akmal Fikri (MYS); Nur Thahira Tasnim (MYS)
2017	(Belgium) Ghent	Majdi Hammami (TUN); Asma El-Belli (TUN)	Nhem Bora (CAM); Sreng Sorakhim (CAM)	Jean Michel Derlincourt (CAN); Sonia Coulombe (CAN)

=== YOUTH ===
==== Youth TRIPLE (Triplette) ====
Youth - Triple (Triplette) - Pétanque World Championships
Edition	Year	Place	GOLD Nation : Players	SILVER Nation : Players	BRONZE Nation : Players
—	2025	Isla Cristina Spain	Italy: Aline Léger; Fabio Musso; Thomas Rinaudo; Asya Vercellone	Madagascar: Harson Andriambelonony; Tafitasoa Nomenjanahary; Nathanaël Rasoloson; Fenohasina Razanakoto	France: Roxane Croquefer, Kaylie Demeter; Dylan Dubois & Sacha Jacquet & Spain 2: Marina Abril, Raúl Molina; Júnior Moral & Alba Valiente
18th	2021	Santa Susanna Spain	France 2 : BONNAURE Jordan - FLEURIEAU Maxime - HUT Andssy - LAURET Dorian Lauga	Madagascar : RAJERISOA Hasina Manampisoa - RAKOTOMALALA Hery Mampandry - RAKOTOMALALA Herizo Mahandry - RAMANANDRAITSIORY Faneva	France 1 : HYVON Bastien - OLIVIER Titouan - MICLO Dawson - BOUTARD Nathan & Netherlands : NUJITEN Elise - GELLEKOM Kim Van - DE BLIJ Michelle - KOK Luca
17th	2019	Phnom Penh	France : CASALE Joe - SAUVAGE Flavien - DUBOIS Jacques - SCHOLL Jordan	Laos : LATPHAKDY Phim - PHANTHALY Pino - VANNACHON Sisom - HOMSOMBATH South	Thailand : RINKEAW Peempod - SAARTAIAM Piya - SEMSAYAN Vudti - KHAMDEE Raychata & Spain : VAZQUEZ Ismael - RIVERO Jose - TABERA Raul - MARTINEZ Raul
16th	2017	Kaihua, China	Madagascar : ANDRIAMANDA Fitahiana - TENDRY Fifaliana RAKOTODRAINIBE Jean François - RAVOHITRARIVO Anjarasoa	France 1 : BALLIERE Theo - CHARRIER Maxime - GELIN Jeremy - DELAHAYE - Adrien	France : BELLOY Axel - DUBOIS Dawson - MONROS Benoit - BALOGE Marius & Belgium : ALEXANDRE Tristan - ANDRIES Marvyn - GHYSSELS Charly - KOCKX Nicky
15th	2015	Bangkok, Thailand	France : AZEVEDO Vincent - DJOUKITCH Dylan - DOERR David - MOLINAS 'Tyson' Joseph	Madagascar : RAZAFIMAHATRATRA Dino - RATIANARISON Judicael - RAKOTOMAVO Nosoavina - RAKOTONDRAIBE Daniel	Thailand : ? ? ? & Laos : ? ? ?
14th	2013	Montauban, France	Thailand 2 : SANGKAEW Thanakorn (boy) - TIPLAY Tanyawadee (girl) - TALEEPUECH Sutima (girl) - SOMNUN Nonthawat (boy)	Madagascar : RADOFASON Fabrice - RAZAFIMANANTSOA Dyno - RATIANARISON Judicael - RANDRIANATOANDRO Fitahiana	France 2: DJOUKITCH Dylan - ZIEGLER Joe - MAGIER Guillaume - LARIVÈRE Corentin & Thailand 1: KANADNID Nipat - PASAOM Titiphong - HOMCHUEN Waranya - LACHIANGKHONG Kanlayanee
13th	2011	Kemer, Turkey	Thailand : AIANGETUEN Naret - TALEEPUECH Sutima - TANONG Kiatkong - TIPLAY Tanyawadee	Germany : Striegel - Anania - Strokosch - Leibelt	France : Julien RENAULT, Pierrick CAILLOT, Maxime DROUILLET et Logan AMOURETTE & Tunisia : MOHSENI Oussama - BEN KHALIL Jamil - CHAABANE Mohamed Amine - BOURGUIBA Hichem
12th	2009	Monastir, Tunisia	Italy : BASSO Alessandro, FARINA Alessio, RIZZI Diego, RATTENNI Gianluca	France : MOUREAUX FONTAN Vianney, CHAMPIGNEUIL Kenny, SANS Jérémy, BLAZCZAK Gaëtan	Spain : GARCÍA Pedro - SOGORB Juan C. - CABALLERO Javier - BERNABÉ Francisco Morocco : BELAHSEN Soufiane - BENHMIDOUCH - SOUABNI - EL BERDICHI
11th	2007	Suwa, Japan	France : CAMACARIS Mathias - ROCHER Dylan - SAVIN Angy - CLERE Logan	Spain : MENDEZ Lorenzo - SOGORB Juan Carlos - MEDINA Christian - AMER Juan	Italy : RIZZI Diego - FARINA Alessio - PAROLA Alessandro - Chiapello Mattia French Polynesia : ??
10th	2005	Longueuil, Canada	France : MALBEC Kevin - PERRET Tony - ROCHER Dylan - SAVIN Angy	Spain : Oscar ALBEROLA, Abel FERNANDEZ, Julian Sergio MUNOZ, Jose Fernando PEREZ	Estonia : BERKMANN Margus - OLMRE Sten - VAGA Rainer & Tunisia : AYARI Aminie - BEN KHALIFA Achraf - EZZI Sadok - LARBI Taieb
9th	2003	Brno, Czech Republic	Madagascar : ANDRIAMAMPIADANA Sitraka T. - RANDRIAMANANTANY Lahatra H. - ALHENJ Zoël Tonitsihoarana - ANDRIAMAMPIADANA Mahefa Dimbinirina	Algéria 1: BOUKHOBZA Sofiane - TALHA Mohamed - MEREZI Mohamed	Spain : PÉREZ Jesús - GONZÁLEZ Rubén - MUÑOZ Sergio - HIDALGO Javier
8th	2001	Lons-Le-Saunier, France	Belgium : PARDOEN Jérémy - GOBLET Julien - BORRE Renaat - HENDERYCKZ Robin	Sweden : VAN HOUTEN Tony - VAN HOUTEN Jimmy - KARP Edward - NOREN Patrik	Spain : CIFUENTES Antonio - HEREDIA Sergio - FERNÁNDEZ Sergio - HIDALGO Javier
7th	1999	Phuket, Thailand	France : LABRUE Ludovic - RUFFO Alexandre - SCULTORE Romain - TAVIAND Nicolas	Switzerland : Marc TESSARI, Michael SALAMIN, Gary VON BERGEN, Guillen DAYER	Finland : HAAPANEN Tero - LESKINEN Aleksi - LESKINEN Tuomas - RANTANEN Kimmo
6th	1997	Geneva, Switzerland	Spain : MARTÍNEZ Ruben - LAO Raul - MEDINA Joaquín - CORRALES David	Thailand : Vinit JARUPANICHKUL, Pravet PANYA, Samran KETNAK, Pongsak SAPYEN	Tunisia : H. MEZZI, A. BRINUS, H. CHELLY, M. SOUAI
5th	1995	Zaragosa, Spain	Spain 1 : AMOROS Francisco - ROMERO Joaquín - REINA Eduardo - RODRÍGUEZ Javier	Spain : CAÑAMARES Daniel - DELGADO Borja - MEDINA Joaquín - FERNÁNDEZ Manuel	Sweden : ERIKSSON Kristoffer - BERGGREN Petrus - IVARSSON Björn - JACOBSSON Bo-Göran
4th	1993	Casablanca, Morocco :	Belgium : VANWETSWINKEL Vincent - CONSTANT Frédéric - MOURDRE Cédric - VANDERBIEST William	Germany : JACKEL Tobias - MARGRANDER Marco - MAHNERT Andrea - FRIESE Michael	Thailand : JANTARANGKUL Tiva - SAPSAT Kitti - KANTIWANIT Jeeradet
3rd	1991	Malmo, Sweden	Belgium : VANDERBIEST William - MOMMENS Laurent - LABYE Laurent - LAGNEAUX Eric	Thailand : PUNNAPIROM Parinya - SIRINAM Sirichai - TANGSRI Somkuan - KAEW-INCHA Master Ball	Algéria : ??
2nd	1989	Tunis, Tunisia	France : Frank FERRAZOLA, Maryan BARTHELEMY, Armand DUMANOIS, Dominique ROIS-PONS	Belgium : MARCHANDISE Joël - HEMON Jean-François - BAVAY Olivier - LAGNEAUX Eric	Madagascar : RASENDRARIVO Jean-Claude - RAKOTONIRIVA Jean-Christian - ANDRIANARIVELO Alain-François
1st	1987	Hasselt, Belgium	France : KELLE Fabrice - REMIATTE Laurent - BONIN Christophe - MARCHAND Christophe	Algéria : Rachid BELAID - Yassine SELHAOUI - TRIAKI Yazid - BECHENOUNE Zinedine	Tunisia : Soufiane LANDOULSI, Adel MOUINE, Moëz HAMMAMI, Sami HEMDANI

==== Youth PRECISION SHOOTING (Tir de précision) ====
Youth - Precision Shooting ( Tir de précision ) - Pétanque World Championships
Edition	Year	Place	GOLD Nation : Players	SILVER Nation : Players	BRONZE Nation : Players
—	2025	Isla Cristina, Spain	Germany : Maria Hein & Tobias Moritz	Thailand : Panadda Suekam & Saharat Aramrod	Switzerland : Sandra Lüthi & Jérémy Biselx French Polynesia : Tekohea Huhina & Wilfred Marae
11th	2021	Santa Susanna, Spain	Madagascar : RAMANANDRAITSIORY Faneva	Poland : BLAZEY Twardowski	France : MICLO Dawson Spain : ESCACHO Yvan
10th	2019	Phnom Penh, Cambodia	Thailand : RINKEAW Peempod	Monaco : BUCHE Jean Philippe	France : CASALE Joe Madagascar : RAKOTOARIVELINA Iarotia
9th	2017	Kaihua, China	France : BALLIERE Theo	Morocco : BOULASSAL Hisham	Thailand : DONINCHAI Kanasak Belgium : ALEXANDRE Tristan
8th	2015	Bangkok, Thailand	Madagascar : RATIANARISON Judichael	Germany : KURBANOV Temur	Monaco : REVIERE Jose & Thailand : TITIPHOM Pasong
7th	2013	Montauban, France	Thailand : THANAKORN Sangkaew	Spain : TRUJILLO Miguel	France : MAGIER Guillaume & Turkey : MUSA Ahmet
6th	2011	Kemer, Turkey	Italy : RIZZI Diego	Belgium : BATON Logan	Germany : STROKOSCH Manuel & Singapore : ZHI MING CHENG
5th	2009	Monastir, Tunisia:	Thailand : KAEWPUDPONG Sarayoot	Belgium : ALEXANDRE Dylan	Italy : RIZZI Diego & Madagascar : RANDRIANARISON Mahefa
4th	2007	Suwa, Japan	Thailand : KAEWPUDPONG Sarayoot	Spain : MENDEZ Lorenzo	France : ROCHER Dylan & Sweden : Jessica JOHANSSON (girl)
3rd	2005	Longueuil, Canada	France : MALBEC Kevin (record : 62 pts)	Spain : ALBEROLA Oscar	Belgium : CHARDON Julien & Italy : BOTTERO Fabrizio
2nd	2003	Brno, Czech Republic	Belgium : ROQUET Cédric	Italy : SALTO Simon	Tunisia : SELLAMI Heithem & Poland : ŚLIŻ Jędrzej
1st	2001	Lons-Le-Saunier, France	Denmark : CHORTZEN Johnni	Belgium : PARDOEN Jeremy	Spain : FERNANDEZ Sergio

==== Youth MEDALS BY NATION - Pétanque World Championships ====
Youth - Overall Medals - Pétanque World Championships
Youth MEDALS						Triple ( Triplette)				Precision Shooting ( Tir de précision )			
Rank	Nation	Gold	Silver	Bronze	Total	Gold	Silver	Bronze	Total	Gold	Silver	Bronze	Total
^{Nov 2019}	^{20}	^{27}	^{27}	^{45}	^{99}	^{17}	^{17}	^{25 (not always 2)}	^{59}	^{10}	^{10}	^{20}	^{40}
1	France	10	2	8	20	8	2	4	14	2	-	4	6
2	Thailand	6	2	6	14	2	2	4	8	4	-	2	6
3	Belgium	4	4	3	11	3	1	1	5	1	3	2	6
4	Madagascar	4	3	3	10	2	3	1	6	2	-	2	4
5	Spain	2	6	6	14	2	3	4	9	-	3	2	4
6	Italy	2	1	3	6	1	-	1	2	1	1	2	4
7	Denmark	1	-	-	1	-	-	-	0	1	-	-	1
8	Germany	-	3	1	4	-	2	-	2	-	1	1	2
9	Algeria	-	2	1	3	-	2	1	3	-	-	-	0
10	Sweden	-	1	2	3	-	1	1	2	-	-	1	1
11	Laos	-	1	1	2	-	1	1	2	-	-	-	0
11	Monaco :	-	1	1	2	-	-	-	0	-	1	1	2
11	Morocco	-	1	1	2	-	-	1	1	-	1	-	1
12	Switzerland	-	1	-	1	-	1	-	1	-	-	-	0
13	Tunisie	-	-	5	5	-	-	4	4	-	-	1	1
14	Poland	-	1	1	2	-	-	-	0	-	1	1	2
14	Turkey :	-	-	1	1	-	-	-	0	-	-	1	1
14	Singapore	-	-	1	1	-	-	-	0	-	-	1	1
14	Finland :	-	-	1	1	-	-	1	1	-	-	-	0
14	Estonia	-	-	1	1	-	-	1	1	-	-	-	0
14	French Polynesia	-	-	1	1	-	-	1	1	-	-	-	0

== Global World Ranking ==
Including all medals from all MEN, WOMEN and YOUTH categories above / update June 2016

Medal Table
Rank	Nation	GRAND TOTAL				MEN				WOMEN				YOUTH			
Rank	Nation	Gold	Silver	Bronze	Total	Gold	Silver	Bronze	Total	Gold	Silver	Bronze	Total	Gold	Silver	Bronze	Total
^{22}	^{36}	^{105}	^{105}	^{154}	^{364}	^{63}	^{63}	^{90}	^{216}	^{27}	^{27}	^{46}	^{100}	^{25}	^{25}	^{40}	^{90}
1	France	51	18	37	106	37	11	24	72	6	5	8	19	8	2	5	15
2	Thailand	15	13	17	45	2	4	5	11	8	7	7	22	5	2	5	12
3	Spain	10	10	15	35	1	3	6	10	7	1	5	13	2	6	4	12
4	Belgium	8	13	18	39	3	8	13	24	1	1	2	4	4	4	3	11
5	Madagascar	7	8	7	22	3	5	1	9	1	1	4	6	3	2	2	7
6	Tunisia	5	12	13	30	4	8	7	19	1	4	1	6	-	-	5	5
7	Switzerland	5	1	3	8	4	-	2	6	-	-	1	1	-	1	-	1
8	Morocco	4	10	9	23	4	9	7	19	-	-	1	1	-	-	1	1
9	Italy	4	2	13	19	2	1	9	12	-	-	1	1	2	1	3	6
10	Cambodia	4	-	4	8	1	-	2	2	3	-	2	5	-	-	-	0
11	Monaco	1	5	1	7	1	5	-	7	-	-	-	0	-	-	1	1
12	Algeria	1	3	3	7	1	1	2	4	-	-	-	0	-	2	1	3
13	Denmark	1	1	0	2	-	-	-	0	-	1	-	1	1	-	-	1
14	Germany	-	4	3	7	-	-	1	1	-	1	1	2	-	3	1	4
15	Canada	-	3	5	8	-	-	1	1	-	3	4	7	-	-	-	0
16	Sweden	-	3	4	7	-	-	-	0	-	2	2	4	-	1	2	3
17	Benin	-	3	1	4	-	3	1	4	-	-	-	0	-	-	-	0
18	Senegal	-	2	2	4	-	2	2	4	-	-	-	0	-	-	-	0
19	French Polynesia	-	1	2	3	-	1	1	2	-	-	-	0	-	-	1	1
20	Ivory Coast	-	1	1	2	-	1	1	2	-	-	-	0	-	-	-	0
20	Netherlands	-	1	1	2	-	-	-	0	-	1	1	2	-	-	-	0
21	Argentina	-	1	-	1	-	1	-	1	-	-	-	0	-	-	-	0
22	Israel	-	-	2	2	-	-	-	0	-	-	2	2	-	-	-	0
22	England.	-	-	2	2	-	-	-	0	-	-	2	2	-	-	-	0
22	Vietnam	-	-	2	2	-	-	-	0	-	-	2	2	-	-	-	0
23	Burkina Faso	-	-	1	1	-	-	1	1	-	-	-	0	-	-	-	0
23	Estonia	-	-	1	1	-	-	-	0	-	-	-	0	-	-	1	1
23	Finland :	-	-	1	1	-	-	-	0	-	-	-	0	-	-	1	1
23	Laos	-	-	1	1	-	-	-	0	-	-	-	0	-	-	1	1
23	Luxembourg	-	-	1	1	-	-	1	1	-	-	-	0	-	-	-	0
23	Mauritania	-	-	1	1	-	-	1	1	-	-	-	0	-	-	-	0
23	Mauritius	-	-	1	1	-	-	1	1	-	-	-	0	-	-	-	0
23	Malaysia	-	-	1	1	-	-	1	1	-	-	-	0	-	-	-	0
23	Poland	-	-	1	1	-	-	-	0	-	-	-	0	-	-	1	1
23	Singapore	-	-	1	1	-	-	-	0	-	-	-	0	-	-	1	1
23	Turkey	-	-	1	1	-	-	-	0	-	-	-	0	-	-	1	1

== Organisations ==
The F.I.P.J.P is composed of the following members elected at last general assembly on 4 October 2012 in Marseilles:

- President: Claude Azema (France)
- Vice-Presidents: Suphonnarth Lamlert (Thailand) & Bernard Aurouze (Canada)
- General Secretary: Céline Peronnet (France)
- General Treasurer: Michel Signaire (France)
- Referee Commission: Laurens Yvon
- Medical Commission: Dr. Giorgio Barone & Dr. Jean-Pierre Cervetti (France)
- Technical Commission: Victor Nataf (France)
- IT Commissioner: Claude Stirmel (France)
- and 7 other members from Belgium, Czech Republic, Italy, Monaco, Tunisia and Turkey,

F.I.P.J.P. is member of C.M.S.B. - Confédération Mondiale des Sports de Boules (World Confederation for Boule Sports) - which group the following sports: Pétanque, Jeu Provençal, Lyonnaise and Rafa.

== See also ==
- Pétanque
- F.I.P.J.P.
- Mondial la Marseillaise à Pétanque
