= Mikloš Mihajlović =

Serbian powerlifter (born 1975)

Personal information
- Full name: Mikloš Mihajlović
- Born: 27 November 1975 (age 50) Novi Sad, SR Serbia, SFR Yugoslavia
- Years active: 2008–2019

Sport
- Country: Serbia
- Sport: Powerlifting, Strongman
- Weight class: -125 kg, -140 kg
Medal record
Representing Serbia
Men's Equipped Powerlifting
World Championships
Bronze medal – third place	Lauchhammer WUAP 2008	140 kg
Men's Raw Bench Press
World Championships
Silver medal – second place	Atlanta WUAP 2011	125 kg
Silver medal – second place	Las Vegas WPC 2012	125 kg
European Championships
Bronze medal – third place	Eger GPC 2011	125 kg
Bronze medal – third place	Praha WPC 2011	125 kg
Sub-Masters World Championships
Gold medal – first place	Atlanta WUAP 2011	125 kg
Gold medal – first place	Tampere GPA 2013	125 kg
Gold medal – first place	Telfs WUAP 2014	140 kg
Gold medal – first place	Lutsk WPA 2015	125 kg
Sub-Masters European Championships
Gold medal – first place	Praha WUAP 2015	140 kg
Men's Equipped Bench Press
European Championships
Silver medal – second place	Trnava WUAP 2008	140 kg
Sub-Masters European Championships
Gold medal – first place	Horn WUAP 2012	125 kg
Masters World Championships
Gold medal – first place	Nové Zámky GPC 2019	125 kg

Mikloš "Miki" Mihajlović (born 27 November 1975) is a Serbian powerlifter and strength athlete. He has competed in international bench press and powerlifting competitions, achieving multiple titles and records in various federations including WUAP and GPC.

== Early life ==
Mihajlović was born in Novi Sad, Serbia. He was involved in sports from a young age, initially training in football and athletics, including sprint disciplines. In his late teens, he transitioned to strength sports, beginning with bodybuilding before later focusing on powerlifting and strongman competitions, he spoke about this and his entire career in multiple articles.

== Powerlifting career ==
Mihajlović has competed in national and international powerlifting and bench press events across Europe. He has participated in competitions organized by several international federations, including WUAP, GPA, GPC, and WPA.

During his career, he achieved multiple first-place finishes at European and world-level bench press championships in heavyweight categories. He has also set federation records in bench press competition like at the 2015 World Championships in Czechia. His First bench press world medal was in Atlanta in 2011, he spoke about it in detail on a TV show in both Serbian and Hungarian. His last competition was in 2019 where he won a gold medal at the GPC World Championships in Nové Zámky, he spoke about this competition and most of his career on a Hungarian TV show based in Serbia among other news articles.

In 2015 he suffered a serious car accident, was in a coma for several days, and hovered between life and death, with doctors giving him only a 1% chance of survival.

== Other activities ==
In addition to competing, Mihajlović has been involved in the organization and promotion of strength sports events in Serbia, including strongman competitions held in Bačka Topola.
