= Rade Savić =

Personal information
- Full name: Rade Savić
- Born: 1984 (age 42) Novi Sad, SR Serbia, SFR Yugoslavia
- Years active: 2011–2017

Sport
- Country: Serbia
- Sport: Powerlifting
- Weight class: -140 kg, 140+ kg
Medal record
Representing Serbia
Men's Raw Bench Press
World Championships
Gold medal – first place	Limerick GPC 2011	140 kg
Gold medal – first place	Bardejov GPC 2012	140+ kg
Silver medal – second place	Pargue WPC 2013	140+ kg
World Cup
Gold medal – first place	Sarajevo GPC 2017	140+ kg
European Championships
Gold medal – first place	Bled GPC 2012	140 kg
Gold medal – first place	Knjaževac GPC 2013	140+ kg
Gold medal – first place	Trutnov GPC 2014	140+ kg
Gold medal – first place	Praha WUAP 2015	140+ kg
Gold medal – first place	Gyula WUAP 2016	140+ kg
Men's Equipped Bench Press
World Championships
Gold medal – first place	Limerick GPC 2011	140 kg
European Championships
Gold medal – first place	Bled GPC 2012	140 kg

Rade Savić (Serbian Cyrillic: Раде Савић; born 1984) is a Serbian powerlifter and bench press specialist. He is a multiple-time Global Powerlifting Committee (GPC) World and European champion and a champion across other non-tested federations. He holds the GPC Raw Bench Press World and European records, as well as the national record with a 290 kg raw bench press and a 370 kg equipped bench press.

== Biography ==
Rade Savić was born in Serbia and is from Gornji Milanovac. He began training at a young age and could reportedly bench press around 140 kg as a teenager. Before focusing on powerlifting, he participated in football. Savić competed primarily in non-tested federations such as the GPC (Global Powerlifting Committee) and WUAP (World United Amateur Powerlifting). He specialized in the bench press, competing mostly in the superheavyweight division.

His records are 290 kg for raw bench press and 370 kg for equipped bench press. He has held the all-time absolute GPC Raw Bench Press World and European records since 2013, and his performance ranks him among the top 50 strongest bench pressers worldwide across all federations.

In addition to his powerlifting career, Rade Savić has participated in humanitarian initiatives. In 2022, he took part in a first aid training program organized by the Red Cross of Serbia as part of the campaign “Život u tvojim rukama” (“Life in Your Hands”), which aims to raise awareness about the importance of cardiopulmonary resuscitation (CPR) and timely response in cases of cardiac arrest. Following the training, Savić emphasized the importance of public education in life-saving techniques, noting that immediate reaction by bystanders can be crucial in emergency situations.
