= EJC =

EJC may refer to:

- Église de Jésus-Christ, an independent Christian church in Congo
- Electronic Journal of Combinatorics, an academic journal
- European Jewish Congress
- European Journal of Cancer, a medical journal
- European Journalism Centre, a journalism institute based in the Netherlands
- European Judo Championships
- European Juggling Convention
- European Junior Championships (disambiguation)
- European Junior Cup, a motorcycling series
- Exon junction complex
- Eunoia Junior College, in Singapore
