= European Pétanque Championships =

European Pétanque Championships are organised by the European Pétanque Federation (Confédération Européenne de Pétanque – CEP) in collaboration with its member country federations. There are five main player groups for competitions: Youth (under 18), Up-and-coming (Espoirs, under 23), Women, Men, and Veteran (over 55). Competitors play a variety of games according to their age. The results of the Championships – excluding Veteran – determine the top 24 Nations to represent Europe at the FIPJP Pétanque World Championship.

== History ==
- 1990s – the idea for a new competition for Youth and Women European players is first discussed by the German and Danish Federations
- 1998 – France, supporting the idea, invite teams for an inaugural event in Dijon, France.
- 1999 – foundation of CEP in Strasbourg, France
- 2000 – 1st Official European Championship for Juniors in Liège, Belgium supported by the Belgian Federation
- 2001 – 1st European Championship for Women in Strasbourg, France.
- 2005–2007 – discussion of the need to create an Espoirs ("up-and-coming") category for young players over 18 but not yet ready for "Open Championships", to build up more competitive experience
- 2008 – 1st European Championship for Espoirs in St-Jean-D'Angely, France.
- 2009 – final but not least, 1st European Championship for Men in Nice, France.
- 2015 – France wins 4th title in Men's Triple and remain unbeaten in this competition.
- 2016 – new Championship Category created: Single Men & Women

== Medallists ==
=== Youth (Under 18) ===
Youth players compete in an Open Triple Game Championship in teams of four players, and individually in a Precision Shooting Championship. Youth competitions are held in even-numbered years, and the results are considered when selecting entrants to the World Championships.

==== Triple team (Triplette) ====
Edition	Year	Place	Triple (Triplette) – Youth – European Pétanque Championships		
Edition	Year	Place	Gold Medal Country: Players	Silver Medal Country: Players	Bronze Medal Country: Players
10th	2016	Monaco	France: Théo Ballière, Delson Boulanger, Lucas Desport, Tyson Molinas.	Belgium	Spain & Italy
9th	2014	Bassens, France	France: Joseph 'Tyson' Molinas, David Doerr, Maxime James, Dylan Djoukitch	Luxembourg: Jean-Luc Carneiro, Adrien Daunois, Felix Schmitz, Thibaut Weber	Spain: Joaquin Grau, David Rasero, Miguel Diaz, Javier Manchón & Belgium: Quentin Triqueneaux, Thomas Bens, Nicky Kockx, Corentin Buffe
8th	2012	Ghent, Belgium	France: Anthony Billet, Guillaume Magier, Julien Renault, Dylan Djoukitch	Belgium 2: Corentin Buffe, Grégory Kausse, Corentin Nicolay, Karim d'Heedene	Spain: Miguel Trujillo, Jonathan Oliver, Miguel Díaz, José Javier Rodríguez & Italy: Andrea Tesio, Matteo Mana, Simone Bertone
7th	2010	Montauban, France	Spain: José Luís Guash, Manuel Higinio Romero, José Gómez Guerrero, José Fernandez	France 1: Gueven Rocher, Mendy Rocher, Baptiste Rousseau, Amourette Logan	Italy: Diego Rizzi, Matteo Rei, Alessandro Basso, Gian-Luca Brondino & Sweden Nanna Bostrom, Alexander Norin, Niklas Carlen, Daniel Eriksson
6th	2008	Nieuwegein, Netherlands	France: Dylan Rocher, Vianney Moureau-Fontan, Gaëtan Blaszczak, Florent Coutanson	Italy: Diego Rizzi, Mattia Chiapello, Alessio Farina, Mattia Balestra	Spain: Francisco Guillen, Pedro Lison, Juan Carlos Sogorb Mancheno, Marc Martinez & Netherlands: Davey Koojiman, Joey van Doorn, Kees Koogje, Tom van der Voort
5th	2006	Martigny, Switzerland	France: Kévin Malbec, Dylan Rocher, Jean Feltain, Florent Coutanson	Spain: Oscar Rodrigo, Oscar Alberola, José Fernandez, Fernando José Perez	Italy: Gabriele Allio, Gianluca Berno, Florian Cometto, David Martino & Switzerland: Fabian Ronzel, Simon Caillat, Fabien Rotzetter, Yohan Bourgeois
4th	2004	Dudelange, Luxembourg	France: Tony Perret, Angy Savin, Jérémy Darodes, Mickaël Jacquet	Spain: Javier Hildago, Sergio Muños, Abel Fernández, Jose Luís Piñero	Denmark: Eric Geraci, Marc Geraci, Anders Erlandsen, Dennis Steffensen & Sweden: Victor von Roggers Patron, Tonny van Houtem, Alexander Lindquist, Leo Brod Björk
3rd	2002	La Louvière, Belgium	Belgium 2: Patrick van Meerbeck, Brecht Claes, Jérémy Pardoen, Robin Henderycks	Italy: Andrea Dalmasso, Daniele Ghigliazza, Simon Salto, Silvi Squarciafichi	France: Michaël Jacquet, Maison Durk, Ludovic Castagne, Mathieu Charpentier & Switzerland: Jimmy Bondallaz, David Freddi, Simon Sorrenti, Cédric Althaus
2nd	2000	Liège, Belgium	Belgium 2: Fabrice Uytterhoeven, Yannick Collaiocco, Jérémy Pardoen, Julien Goblet	Italy: Simon Salto, Daniele Ghigliazza, Silvio Squarciafichi, Fabrizio Ellena	France: Sébastien Boissel, Romain Scultore, Richard Mondillon, Florent Montoya & Denmark: Launy Larsen, Alexander Vogensen, Jan Kristensen
1st	1998	Dijon, France	France: Ludovic Labrue, Nicolas Tavian, Cédric Le Foll, Mickael Rognon, Eric Royer, Fabien Sauvage	Spain: Joaquin Teruel, José A. Nebot, Ezequiel Marron, Antonio Figueras, Antonio Ruiz, Agustin Hernandez	Belgium: Raphaël Delnoy, Michaël Tollet, Nicolas David, Giovani Buttera, Greet van Houtte, Franck Geelen, Gino Claes & Switzerland

==== Precision Shooting (Tir de Précision) ====
Edition	Year	Place	Precision Shooting – Youth – European Pétanque Championships			
Edition	Year	Place	Gold Medal Country: Players	Silver Medal Country: Players	Bronze Medal Country: Players	European Records – Stage Country: Name
8th	2016	Monaco	France: Joseph Molinas	Spain: Cristian Carrillo	Monaco: José Rivière & Belgium: Tristan Alexandre	– no new record –
7th	2014	Bassens, France	France: Joseph Molinas	Italy: Saverio Amormino	Switzerland: Alexandre Utz & Sweden: William Silfverberg	– no new record –
6th	2012	Ghent, Belgium	Poland: Pawel Pieprzyck	Netherlands: Rick van Lier	Switzerland: Gaëtan Amman & France: Guillaume Magier	57 pts – 1/4 Final Guillaume Magier France
5th	2010	Montauban, France	Sweden: Alexander Norin	Netherlands: Tom van der Voort	Italy: Diego Rizzi & Monaco: Pierre Luchesi	– no new record –
4th	2008	Nieuwegein, Netherlands	Spain: Juan Carlos Sogorb	Italy: Mattia Chiapello	Sweden: Alexander Norin & France: Dylan Rocher	– no new record –
3rd	2006	Martigny, Switzerland	France: Dylan Rocher	Belgium: Michael Bonvoisin	Denmark: Dennis Steffensen & Israel: Adar Redlinger	54 pts – Final Dylan Rocher France
2nd	2004	Dudelange, Luxembourg	France: Jérémy Darodes	Switzerland: Justin Metrailler	Spain: Abel Fernandez & Denmark: Eric Geraci	– no new record –
1st	2002	La Louvière, Belgium	Monaco: Benjamin Debos	Italy: Simon Salto	Germany: Patrick Beton & Switzerland: Jimmy Bondallaz	41 pts – Semi Final Simon Salto Italy
-	2000	Liège, Belgium	No Precision Shooting competition that year			
-	1998	Dijon, France	No Precision Shooting competition that year			

=== Women ===
Women's players compete in a Triple Game Championship in teams of four players, and individually in a Precision Shooting Championship. In addition, there is a single head-to-head competition. Women's competitions are presently held in even-numbered years, and the results are taken into account when selecting entrants to the World Championships.

==== Triple team (Triplette) ====
Edition	Year	Place	Triple (Triplette) – Women – European Pétanque Championships		
Edition	Year	Place	Gold Medal Country: Players	Silver Medal Country: Players	Bronze Medal Country: Players
11th	2024	Santa Susanna, Spain	Belgium: Nancy Barzin; Camille Max; Jessica Meskens; Madison Vleminckx	Netherlands: Josefien Koogje; Sandy Rikkers; Katy Kamps-Bosch; Roby van Rooijen	Spain: Sara Díaz; Marta de los Reyes; Yolanda Matarranz; Aurelia Blázquez & France: Charlotte Darodes; Nelly Peyré; Cindy Peyrot; Alexia Pinto
10th	2022	Torrelavega, Spain	France: Audrey Bandiera, Charlotte Darodes, Cindy Peyrot, Emma Picard	Italy: Monica Scalise, Vanessa Romeo, Valentina Petulicchio, Mariangela Arcesto	Israel & Monaco
9th	2018	Palavas-les-Flots, France	France: Anna Maillard, Angélique Colombet, Charlotte Darodes, Daisy Frigara	Italy: Vanessa Romeo, Serena Sacco, Jessica Rattenni, Valentina Petulicchio	Germany & Switzerland
8th	2016	Bratislava, Slovakia	France: Angélique Papon, Anna Maillard, Ludivine d'Isodoro, Cindy Peyrot	Spain: Yolanda Matarranz, Aurelia Blázquez, Inés Rosario, Melani Homar	Italy & Austria
7th	2014	Mersin, Turkey	Spain: Yolanda Matarranz, Aurelia Blázquez, Rosario Inés, Melani Homar	Denmark: Camilla Svensson, Maria Saxild-Laursen, Mia Carlsson, Line Hjorth	Germany & Belgium
6th	2012	Ghent, Belgium	France: Angélique Papon, Anna Maillard, Nelly Peyré, Marie-Angèle Germain	Spain: Yolanda Matarranz, Veronica Martínez, Silvia Garcés, Maria José Pérez	Denmark: Mia Carlsson, Tanja Gromada, Maria Saxild, Camilla Svensson & Sweden: Jessica Johansson, Jenny Hamberg, Anna Theander, Rebecka Bergstrom
5th	2010	Ljubljana, Slovenia	France: Angélique Papon, Anna Maillard, Ludivine d'Isidoro, Marie Christine Virebayre	Denmark: Camilla Svensson, Maria Sonasson, Mia Carlsson, Tina Bach-Poulsen	Spain: Aurelia Blázquez, Silvia Garcés, Veronica Martínez, Yolanda Matarranz & Germany: Susanne Fleckenstein, Carolin Birkmeyer, Muriel Hess, Indra Waldbüsser
4th	2007	Ankara, Turkey	Sweden: Lotta Larsson, Jessica Johansson, Lotta Bromer, Sara Lindelof	Czech Rep.: Alis Hancova, Lucie Klusova, Hana Srubarova, Romana Vokrouhlikova	Netherlands: Katy Bosch, Karin Zantingh, Karin Rudolfs, Marina Blom & Italy: Jaqueline Grosso, Irma Giraudo, Barbara Beccaria, Serena Sacco
3rd	2005	Odense, Denmark	France: Evelyne Lozano, Angélique Papon, Cynthia Quennehen, Marie-Christine Virebayre	Spain: María-José Pérez, Jerónima Ballesta, Verónica Martínez, Yolanda Matarranz	Belgium: Nancy Barzin, Paulette Doore, Linda Goblet, Oscarine Stevens & Sweden
2nd	2003	Rastatt, Germany	Spain: María-José Pérez, Jerónima Ballesta, María-José Díaz, Yolanda Matarranz	France: Angélique Papon, Cynthia Quennehen, Chantal Salaris, Florence Schopp	Germany: Gudrun Deterding, Lara Eble, Daniela Thelen, Susi Fleckenstein
1st	2001	Strasbourg, France	France: Angélique Papon, Florence Schopp, Cynthia Quennehen, Ranya Kouadry	Spain: Jerónima Ballesta, Inés Rosario, Catalina Mayol, Yolanda Matarranz	U.K

==== Precision Shooting (Tir de Précision) ====
Edition	Year	Place	Precision Shooting – Women – European Pétanque Championships			
Edition	Year	Place	Gold Medal Country: Players	Silver Medal Country: Players	Bronze Medal Country: Players	European Records – Stage Country: Name
10th	2024	Santa Susanna, Spain	Spain: Sara Díaz	France: Cindy Peyrot	Sweden: Annelie Westin & Austria: Isabella Thill	50 pts – Repêchage Sweden: Annelie Westin
9th	2022	Torrelavega, Spain	Spain: Sara Díaz	Switzerland: Sylviane Métairon	Belgium: Jessica Meskens & Poland: Katarzyna Błasiak	60 pts – Repêchage Belgium: Jessica Meskens
8th	2018	Palavas-les-Flots, France	France: Charlotte Darodes	Israel: Sivan Siri	Switzerland: Ludivine Maître Wicki & Slovenia: Kaja Jamnik	54 pts – Repêchage Slovenia: Kaja Jamnik
7th	2016	Bratislavia, Slovakia	Spain: Yolanda Matarranz	Sweden: Jessica Johansson	France: Cindy Peyrot & U.K: Sarah Huntley	50 pts – Qualifications Spain: Yolanda Matarranz
6th	2014	Mersin, Turkey	Spain: Yolanda Matarranz	France: Audrey Bandiera	Belgium: Camille Max & Norway: Ranu Homniam	44 pts – Qualifications Belgium: Camille Max
5th	2012	Ghent, Belgium	France: Angélique Papon	Spain: Yolanda Matarranz	Denmark: Maria Carlson & Germany: Indra Waldbüßer	– no new record –
4th	2010	Ljubljana, Slovenia	France: Angélique Papon	Israel: Sivan Siri	Czech Rep.: Lucie Venclova & Spain: Yolanda Matarranz	42 pts – Final France: Angélique Papon
3rd	2007	Ankara, Turkey	Netherlands: Karin Rudolfs	Spain: Inés Rosario	France: Angélique Papon & Germany: Anna Lazaridis	42 pts – Qualifications France: Angélique Papon
2nd	2005	Odense, Denmark	France: Angélique Papon	Switzerland: Ludivine Maître	Finland: Tarja Roslöf & Netherlands: Karin Rudolfs	– no new record –
1st	2003	Rastatt, Germany	France: Cynthia Quennehen	Netherlands: Karin Zantingh	Belgium: Carine Stevens & Switzerland: Ludivine Maître	33 pts – 1/4 Final France: Cynthia Quennehen

==== Single (Tête-à-tête) ====
Edition	Year	Place	Single – Women – European Pétanque Championships		
Edition	Year	Place	Gold Medal Country: Players	Silver Medal Country: Players	Bronze Medal Country: Players
1st	2016	Halmstad, Sweden	Spain: Yolanda Matarranz	Sweden: Jessica Johansson	Belgium: Natachsa Kazmierczak & Poland: Katarzyna Błasiak
2nd	2018				
3rd	2022	's-Hertogenbosch, Netherlands	Spain: Carolina Pascual	Turkey: Esile Emen	France: Aurélie Bories & Netherlands: Josefien Koogje
4th	2024	Martigny, Switzerland	France: Aurélie Bories	Monaco: Myriam Chambeiron	Turkey: Nazmiye Ak & Spain: María José Díaz
5th	2026	Lorca, Spain	Sweden: Jessica Johansson	France: Aurélie Bories	Luxembourg: Indira Ongaro & Germany: Nina Schell

==== Doubles (Doublette) ====
Edition	Year	Place	Single – Men – European Pétanque Championships		
Edition	Year	Place	Gold Medal Country: Players	Silver Medal Country: Players	Bronze Medal Country: Players
1st	2022	's-Hertogenbosch, Netherlands	Monaco: Laura Vierjon & Myriam Chambeiron	England: Alexandra Spillett & Hannah Griffin	Lithuania: Eugenija Karbočienė & Irma Bagdanavičienė Spain: Carolina Pascual & Jennifer López
2nd	2024	Martigny, Switzerland	France: Aurélie Bories & Charlotte Darodes	Belgium: Camille Max & Jessica Meskens	Germany: Carolin Birkmeyer & Anna Lazaridis & Luxembourg: Indira Ongaro & Julie Feller
3rd	2026	Lorca, Spain	Spain: Sara Díaz & Melani Homar	Switzerland: Corinne Althaus & Yvonne Bless	France: Aurélie Bories & Charlotte Darodes & Belgium: Madison Schollaert & Jessica Meskens

=== Espoirs (Under 23 years old) ===
In the Espoirs Championships, Young Men and Young Women compete separately in teams of four players in a combination of games: a Triple game, and a Double game played simultaneously with a Single game. Espoirs compete in odd-numbered years.

Edition	Year	Place	Women U23 Espoirs – European Pétanque Championships			Men U23 Espoirs – European Pétanque Championships		
Edition	Year	Place	Gold Medal Country: Players	Silver Medal Country: Players	Bronze Medal Country: Players	Gold Medal Country: Players	Silver Medal Country: Players	Bronze Medal Country: Players
13th	2025	Benejúzar, Spain	Germany: Ella Koch, Silvana Lichte, Celine Grauer, Mercedes Strokosch	Belgium: Elisa David, Lucie David, Chloé Dierckx, Madison Vleminckx	France: Manon Pruvot, Laurine Roger, Pauline Reguenga, Océanne Bodenghiem & Turkey: Merve Deniz, Semra Akyol, Selamet Keșli	France: Titouan Olivier, Noa Molins, Evan Papillon, Lucas Bulliard	Italy: Davide Caporgno, Michele Ferrero, Roberto de Glaudi, Demis Vailatti	Monaco: Romain Demolis, Julien Lisserre, Damien Egea, Moreno Gomez & Spain: Sergi Ruiz, Aarón González, Raúl Martínez, Ismael Vázquez
12th	2024	Isla Cristina, Spain	France: Manon Pruvot, Océanne Bodenghiem, Laurine Roger, Pauline Reguenga	Monaco: Caroline Godard, Kimberley Chardelin, Camille Podair, Sasha Djaghrif	Sweden: Frida Brage, Emelie Källström, Ängla Patron, Frida von Eggers Patron & Germany: Mercedes Lehner, Celine Grauer, Laura Caliebe, Kati Kuipers	France: Titouan Olivier, Flavien Sauvage, Jacques Dubois, Jayson Rycerz	Spain: Raúl Martínez, Aarón González, Manel Luque, Raúl Tabera	Monaco: Julien Lisserre, Louis Marsille, Rayan Boulanger, Damien Egea & Portugal: Rodrigo Brás, Rafael Cavaco, Samuel Silva, Diogo Gonçalves
11th	2023	Monaco	Spain: Sheila Carrillo, Mª Auxiliadora Soto, María Artacho, Elena Castillo	Germany: Nina Schell, Mercedes Lehner, Celine Grauer, Laura Caliebe	France: Camille Agrinier, Manon Pruvot, Maelle Piquard, Océanne Bodenghiem & Belgium: Madison Vleminckx, Manon Bronckart, Léa le Dantec, Aurore van Loo	Italy: Eros Aziz, Davide Caporgno, Jacopo Gardella, Andrea Damiano	Spain: Raúl Tabera, Manel Luque, Sergi Ruiz, Jesús Escacho	France: Myron Baudino, Flavien Sauvage, Adrien Delahaye, Bastien Hyvon & Belgium: Renaud Herr, Romain Wagener, Jérôme Creyelman, Quentin Barbiaux
5th	2015	Nieuwegein, Netherlands	France: Anaïs Lapoutge, Audrey Bandiera, Cindy Peyrot, Alison Rodriguez	Italy: Laura Cardo, Martina Simonotto, Jessica Rattenni, Sara Dedominici	Belgium: Alysson Smal, Allisson Vandaele, Clotilde Max, Madison Schollaert & Sweden: Noon Geffenblad, Jessica Karlsson, Cajsa Qvarnström, Malin Sares	Italy: Andrea Tesio, Diego Rizzi, Alessandro Basso, Luca Palermo	Spain: Jose Luis Guasch, Manuel Moreno, Miguel Trujillo, Sergi Rodríguez	Germany: Manuel Strokosch, Marco Lonken, Moritz Rosik, Robin Stentenbach & Netherlands: Tom van der Voort, Joey van Doorn, Rick van Lier, Charles Gelijn
4th	2013	Düsseldorf, Germany	France: Audrey Bandiera, Anna Maillard, Morgane Bacon, Anaïs Lapoutge	Spain: Marta Fernández, Diana Castro, Cynthia Arrabal, Melani Homar	Italy: Laura Cardo, Sara Domici, Giulia Levaggi, Jessica Rattenni & Switzerland: Elena Baumgartner, Nicola Bégue, Emilie Métairon, Mélanie Schüpbach	France : Logan Amourette, Florent Coutanson, Williams Dauphant, Dylan Rocher	Italy : Alessandro Basso, Mattia Chiapello, Gianluca Rattenni, Diego Rizzi	Belgium: Logan Baton, Dylan Alexandre, Jonas Buyck, Dieter Verplancke & Denmark: Morten Junge, Daniel Presutti, Mathias Beyer, Lasse Dithmar
3rd	2011	Roskilde, Denmark	Germany: Natasha Denzinger, Muriel hess, Lea Mitschker, Julia Würthe	France: Céline Baron, Nadège Baussian, Maryline Cegarra, Anna Maillard	Spain:Jennifer López, Cynthia Arrabal, Carolina Jiménez, Ana Fernández & Belgium: Inje Grotjans, Camille Max, Stéphanie Moiny, Jordane Parker	France: Florent Coutanson, Jean Feltain, Kévin Malbec, Dylan Rocher	Monaco: Yohan Borde, Vincent Fernandez, Joseph Jimenez, Pierre Lucchesi	Italy: Alessandro Basso, Mattia Chiapello, Alex Marro, Gianluca Rattenni & Germany: Mika Everding, Till-Vincent Götzke, Frank Maurer, Nicolas Zimmer
2nd	2009	Düsseldorf, Germany	Germany: Muriel Hess, Anna Lazardis, Julia Würthle, Judith Berganski	France : Anna Maillard, Ludivine d'Isidoro, Nadège Baussian, Kelly Fuchès	Spain: Jennifer López, Sandra García, Eva Lisbona, Carmen Escagedo & Sweden	France: Jérémy Darodes, Dylan Rocher, Mickaël Jacquet, Jean Feltain	Spain: Oscar Alberola, Lorenzo Méndez, José Luis Piñero, Abel Fernández	Italy: Alessandro Parola, Matteo Berno, Fabrizio Bottero, Mattia Chiapello & Germany: Micha Abdul, Zeki Engin, Jannik Schaake, Florian Korsch
1st	2008	St-Jean-D'Angely, France	France: Emilie Fernandez, Nadège Baussian, Ludivine d'Isidoro, Nelly Peyre, Marguerite Briançon	Germany: Muriel Hess, Anna Lazardis, Julia Würthle, Judith Berganski	Belgium: Jérémy Pardoen, Didier van Zeebroek, Kévin Mievis, Michael Bonvoisin & Denmark	France: Jérémy Darodes, Mathieu Charpentier, Mickaël Jacquet, Jean Feltain	Spain: Oscar Alberola Marquez, Javier Hidalgo, Jesús Pérez Martin, Abel Fernández Tortosa	Belgium: Julien Chardon, Kévin Mievis, Didier van Zeebroek & Netherlands: Bran Bookelaer, Lars Dolmans, Dirk Jan van Mourik

=== Men ===
Men's players compete in a Triple Game Championship in teams of four players, and individually in a Precision Shooting Championship. In addition, there is a single head-to-head competition. Men's competitions are held in even-numbered years, and the results are taken into account when deciding entrants to the World Championships.

==== Triple Team (Triplette) ====
Edition	Year	Place	Triple (Triplette) – Men – European Pétanque Championships		
Edition	Year	Place	Gold Medal Country: Players	Silver Medal Country: Players	Bronze Medal Country: Players
8th	2025	Santa Susanna, Spain	Germany: Matthias Laukart, Tobias Müller, Daniel Reichert, Moritz Rosik	France: Michael Bonetto, Yoan Cousin, David "Ligan" Doerr, Ludovic Montoro	Netherlands: Erik Rolf Telkamp, Remko de Jong, Moussa Agzoul, Essa Agzoul & Spain: Manuel Higinio Romero, José Luis Guasch, Lucas Álvarez, Ramón Asensi
7th	2023	Albertville, France	France: David "Ligan" Doerr, Jean Feltain, Ludovic Montoro, Philippe Suchaud	Italy: Florian Cometto, Andrea Chiapello, Alessio Cocciolo, Diego Rizzi	Belgium: Charles Weibel, Logan Baton, Michaël Masuy, Fabrice Uytterhoeven & Monaco: Salah Kanes, Jean-Pierre Le Lons, Eric Motté, Denis Olmos
4th	2015	Albena, Bulgaria	France: Damien Hureau, Henri Lacroix, Michel Loy, Dylan Rocher	Switzerland: Joseph Molinas, Maiki Molinas, Patrick Emile, Fornerod Olivier	Spain: Antonio Barbera, José Luis Guasch, Javier Caballero, Alejandro Cardeñas, Víctor García & Monaco: Eric Motté, Franck Millo, Jean-Dominique Fieschi, Guillaume Campillo
3rd	2013	Roma, Italy	France: Kévin Malbec, Dylan Rocher, Zvonco Radnic, Jean Feltain	Monaco: Rémy Galleau, Nicolas Rivière, Franck Millo, Eric Motté	Italy: Alessio Cocciolo, Gianni Laigueglia, Fabio Dutto, Diego Rizzi & Spain: Miguel Darder, José Luis Guasch, Fransisco Javier Berzal, Francisco Javier Flores
2nd	2011	Gothenburg, Sweden	France: Michel Loy, Kévin Malbec, Jean-Michel Puccinelli, Dylan Rocher	Monaco: Eric Motté, Franck Millo, Nicolas Rivière, Philippe Perez	Italy & Spain: Ignacio Egea, Francisco Javier Flores, Roberto C. López, Juan A. Jiménez
1st	2009	Nice, France	France 2: Henri Lacroix, Bruno le Boursicaud, Philippe Suchaud, Thierry Grandet	Spain: Francisco Palazón, Manuel Higinio Romero, Víctor García, Antonio López	France 1: Christophe Sarrio, Philippe Quintais, Stéphane Robineau, Michel Loy & Denmark: Morten Saxild Hansen

==== Precision Shooting (Tir de Précision) ====
Edition	Year	Place	Precision Shooting – Men – European Pétanque Championships			
Edition	Year	Place	Gold Medal Country: Players	Silver Medal Country: Players	Bronze Medal Country: Players	European Records – Stage Country: Name
8th	2025	Santa Susanna, Spain	France: Michael Bonetto	Armenia: Michel Hatchadourian	Italy: Diego Rizzi & Monaco: José Rivière	– no new record –
7th	2023	Albertville, France	Spain: Manuel Higinio Romero	Belgium: Logan Baton	France: David "Ligan" Doerr & Italy: Diego Rizzi	– no new record –
4th	2015	Albena, Bulgaria	Italy: Diego Rizzi	Belgium: Logan Baton	France: Dylan Rocher & Slovakia: Juraj Valent	63 pts – Qualification France: Dylan Rocher
3rd	2013	Roma, Italy	France: Dylan Rocher	Italy: Diego Rizzi	Estonia: Veiko Proos & Belgium: Charles "Claudy" Weibel	– no new record –
2nd	2011	Gothenburg, Sweden	France: Dylan Rocher	Denmark: Emil Petersen	Estonia: Veiko Proos & Netherlands: Wietse van Keulen	61 pts – Final France: Dylan Rocher
1st	2009	Nice, France	Belgium: Charles "Claudy" Weibel	France: Philippe Quintais	Sweden: Richard Nilsson & Switzerland: Didier Senezergues	55 pts – 1/4 Final Belgium: Charles "Claudy" Weibel

==== Single (Tête à tête) ====
Edition	Year	Place	Single – Men – European Pétanque Championships		
Edition	Year	Place	Gold Medal Country: Players	Silver Medal Country: Players	Bronze Medal Country: Players
1st	2016	Halmstad, Sweden	France: Henry Lacroix	Switzerland: Patrick Emile	Sweden: Rickard Nilsson Germany: Raphael Gharany
2nd	2018				
3rd	2022	's-Hertogenbosch, Netherlands	Italy: Diego Rizzi	Spain: Jesús Escacho	Netherlands: Kees Koogje France: Christophe Sarrio
4th	2024	Martigny, Switzerland	Spain: Jesús Escacho	Sweden: Ivar Liljegren	France: Henry Lacroix & Monaco: Christophe Sévilla
5th	2026	Lorca, Spain	France: Mickaël Bonetto	Italy: Andrea Chiapello	Israel: Dan Shiran & England: Kai Sheffield

==== Doubles (Doublette) ====
Edition	Year	Place	Single – Men – European Pétanque Championships		
Edition	Year	Place	Gold Medal Country: Players	Silver Medal Country: Players	Bronze Medal Country: Players
1st	2022	's-Hertogenbosch, Netherlands	Italy: Diego Rizzi & Alessio Cocciolo	Belgium: Michaël Masuy & Fabrice Uytterhoeven	England: Matthew Eversden & Jack Blows Israel: Eliyahu Ohana & Dan Shiran
2nd	2024	Martigny, Switzerland	France: Henry Lacroix & David Doerr	Netherlands: Kees Koogje & Joey van Doorn	Monaco: Christophe Sévilla & Vincent Ferrandez & Belgium: Charles Weibel & Logan Baton
3rd	2026	Lorca, Spain	Spain: José Luis Guasch & Jesús Escacho	Italy: Andrea Chiapello & Jacopo Gardella	France: Mickaël Bonetto & Yohan Cousin & Monaco: José Rivière & Vincent Ferrandez

== Mixed ==
=== Doubles (Doublette) ===
Edition	Year	Place	Single – Men – European Pétanque Championships		
Edition	Year	Place	Gold Medal Country: Players	Silver Medal Country: Players	Bronze Medal Country: Players
1st	2024	Martigny, Switzerland	Belgium: Logan Baton & Jessica Meskens	Netherlands: Joey van Doorn & Josefien Koogje	Germany: Matthias Laukart & Anna Lazaridis & France: David Doerr & Charlotte Darodes
2nd	2026	Lorca, Spain	Italy: Jacopo Gardella & Sara Ferrera	France: Yohan Cousin & Charlotte Darodes	Spain: Jesús Escacho & Melani Homar & Denmark: Lasse Dithmar & Maria Saxild-Laursen

=== Veteran (Over 55 years old) ===
Veterans compete in even-numbered years in a Triple Game Championship with teams of four players.

==== Triple Team (Triplette) ====
Edition	Year	Place	Triple (Triplette) – Veteran – European Pétanque Championships		
Edition	Year	Place	Gold Medal Country: Players	Silver Medal Country: Players	Bronze Medal Country: Players
3rd	2016	Monaco	October 2016		
2nd	2014	LuleaSweden	Monaco: René Pintus, Gilbert Cimelli, Paul Olivier, Daniel Merello	Denmark	Germany & Netherlands
1st	2012	Denmark	Spain: Luis de los Reyes, Antonio López, Vicente Cabrera	Germany: Klaus Eschbach, Rolando Jecle, Detlev Krieger, Michel Lauer	Finland & Monaco

== Ranking by Country: Youth / Women / Men ==
Europ. Pétanque Champ. – Medals by country – Youth
Rank	Country	Gold	Silver	Bronze	Total
Rank	Country	^{18}	^{18}	^{34}	69
1	France	11	1	4	16
2	Spain	2	4	4	10
3	Belgium	2	2	4	8
4	Sweden	1	0	3	4
4	Monaco	1	0	3	4
5	Poland	1	0	0	1
6	Italy	0	6	3	9
7	Netherlands	0	2	1	3
8	Luxembourg	0	2	0	2
9	Switzerland	0	0	6	6
10	Denmark	0	0	4	4
11	Germany	0	0	2	2
12	Israel	0	0	1	1
-	Finland	0	0	0	0
-	Norway	0	0	0	0
-	U.K.	0	0	0	0

Europ. Pétanque Champ. – Medals by country – Women – Senior & Espoir
Rank	Country	Gold	Silver	Bronze	Total
Rank	Country	^{21}	^{21}	^{44}	^{86}
1	France	12	4	2	18
2	Spain	5	6	5	16
3	Germany	2	1	5	8
4	Sweden	1	2	6	9
5	Netherlands	1	1	2	4
6	Denmark	0	2	3	5
7	Switzerland	0	2	2	4
8	Italy	0	1	3	4
9	Czech Rep.	0	1	1	2
10	Israel	0	1	0	1
11	Belgium	0	0	8	8
12	Finland	0	0	2	2
12	U.K.	0	0	2	2
13	Norway	0	0	1	1
13	Austria	0	0	1	1
13	Poland	0	0	1	1
-	Luxembourg	0	0	0	0
-	Monaco	0	0	0	0

Europ. Pétanque Champ. – Medals by country – Men – Senior & Espoir
Rank	Country	Gold	Silver	Bronze	Total
Rank	Country	^{14}	^{14}	^{27}	^{55}
1	France	11	1	2	14
2	Italy	2	2	4	8
3	Belgium	1	1	3	5
4	Spain	0	4	3	7
5	Monaco	0	3	1	4
	Switzerland	0	2	0	2
6	Denmark	0	1	2	3
7		0	2	0	2
8	Germany	0	0	3	3
8	Netherlands	0	0	3	3
9	Estonia:	0	0	2	2
10	Slovakia	0	0	1	1
10	Sweden	0	0	1	1
-	Czech Rep.	0	0	0	0
-	Finland	0	0	0	0
-	Israel	0	0	0	0
-	Luxembourg	0	0	0	0
-	Norway	0	0	0	0
-	Poland	0	0	0	0
-	U.K.	0	0	0	0
