= Open Europe (disambiguation) =

Open Europe may refer to:

- GT Cup Open Europe (motorsports), a GT4 grand touring sports car championship series
- Alliance for an Open Europe (politics), a Eurosceptic and free market transnational political organisation
- Open Europe (politics), a defunct British centre-right eurosceptic policy think tank
  - Policy Exchange (politics), the organization into which Open Europe merged into

== See also ==
- OpenForum Europe (software)
- European Open (disambiguation)
