= European Senior Masters =

European Senior Masters can refer to either of two European Senior Tour golf tournaments.

- Farmfoods European Senior Masters, first played in 2017
- Travis Perkins Masters, called the Bovis Lend Lease European Senior Masters from 2002 to 2005 and the European Senior Masters in 2006 and 2007
