= Eurogames =

Eurogames may refer to:

- Eurogame, a type of board game
- EuroGames, an LGBT sporting event in Europe
- Eurogames (game publisher), a French board game publisher operated by Descartes Editeur
- European Games, an international multi-sport event contested by athletes from European nations

== See also ==
- European Masters Games
- Eurogamer, an English video game news website
