= European Master in Management =

- Established: 2007; 19 years ago
- Affiliations: EMLYON Business School, LMU Munich, Lancaster University Management School
- Location: Lyon, France; Munich, Germany; (United Kingdom) Lancaster, UK
- Colours: Red and Green
- Website: www.european-master.com

The European Master in Management (EMM) was a two-year general management master program run jointly by three European business schools. These were the EMLYON Business School (France), LMU Munich (Germany) and Lancaster University Management School (UK). The purpose of the program was to allow students to study international business from a European and global perspective.

The European Master in Management was a triple master's degree based in the France, Germany and the UK. After completing all program requirements, students were awarded three MSc Diplomas: one from each of the Partner Universities. The EMM was the first European triple-degree program.

The objective of the EMM was to prepare students for a wide range of career possibilities all focused on global business through a combination of academic periods on different campuses, in-company internships, and a unique multicultural European experience with a great diversity in the student body. The first year was devoted to general management courses, whereas the second year was dedicated to a specialization in Corporate Finance, Marketing, Strategy & Change or Corporate Development.

== History ==
When the program was launched, in 2007, Aston Business School was the program's Partner University in the UK. After Aston Business School left the partnership, the program was run as a double degree master from EMLYON Business School and LMU Munich (Germany) until Lancaster University Management School joined the partnership, bringing it back to a triple degree program.

== Program ==
In the first year, students stayed on the same campus in France (EMLYON Business School) and were provided with a broad foundation of management knowledge. Each fundamental management course gave students a broader perspective of global business, as it was designed and taught jointly by a team of professors from EMLYON, LMU Munich and LUMS.

During the second year, students took on an elective specialisation. This is an opportunity to study at a new campus, depending on the specialization chosen:

- Corporate Finance at EMLYON Business School (at the European Campus in Lyon or at the Asian Campus in Shanghai)
- Marketing at EMLYON Business School (at the European Campus in Lyon)
- Strategy & Change at LMU Munich (at the campus in Munich)
- Corporate Development at Lancaster University Management School (at the campus in Lancaster)

Students spent at least one semester in a company, on a management internship, and had to write a professionally oriented Master's Dissertation. This provides the opportunity to strengthen relations with the business world.

== European Master in Management Partners Companies ==
Throughout the year, students had multiple opportunities to contact with the corporate partners. Different companies were frequently represented on campus, either to give lectures and seminars or to offer internship and job opportunities directly to the students.
