= 49er & 49er FX Oceania Championships =

49er & 49er FX Oceania Championships are Oceania Championship sailing regattas in the 49er and the 49er FX classes organised by the International 49er Class Association.

== Editions ==
Year	City	Country	Dates	Events	Athletes	Nations	Note
2017	Manly	Australia	27–31 December	2			
