= IPSC African Handgun Championship =

Shooting competition

The IPSC African Handgun Championship is an IPSC level 4 championship hosted every third year in Africa.

== History ==
- 1994 Pretoria, South Africa
- 1997 Pretoria, South Africa
- 2000 Johannesburg, South Africa
- 2003 Pietersburg, South Africa
- 2006 Johannesburg, South Africa
- 2009 Polokwane, South Africa
- 2012 Bulawayo, Zimbabwe
- 2015 Cape Town, South Africa
- 2018 Polokwane, South Africa
- 2021 South Africa

== Champions ==
The following is a list of current and past IPSC African Handgun champions.

=== Overall category ===
| Year | Division | Gold | Silver | Bronze | Venue |
|---|---|---|---|---|---|
| 1994 | Open | | | | Pretoria, South Africa |
| 1994 | Standard | | | | Pretoria, South Africa |
| 2000 | Open | | | | Johannesburg, South Africa |
| 2000 | Modified | | | | Johannesburg, South Africa |
| 2000 | Standard | | | | Johannesburg, South Africa |
| 2003 | Open | (South Africa) Hubert Montgomery | (South Africa) Dax Hall | (South Africa) Jonathan Griffiths | Pietersburg, South Africa |
| 2003 | Standard | (South Africa) Nick Du Plessis | (South Africa) Fabian Scott | (South Africa) Muhammed Kolia | Pietersburg, South Africa |
| 2003 | Production | (South Africa) Alan Bucke | (South Africa) Eugene Lurie | (South Africa) Robert Hopper | Pietersburg, South Africa |
| 2006 | Open | (South Africa) Hubert Montgomery | (South Africa) Eddie Smith | (South Africa) Kenny VanderMerwe | Johannesburg, South Africa |
| 2006 | Standard | (South Africa) Guy Stockbridge | (South Africa) Alex Gogos | (South Africa) Fabian Scott | Johannesburg, South Africa |
| 2006 | Production | (South Africa) Eugene Lurie | (South Africa) Albert Wessels | (South Africa) MH Christie | Johannesburg, South Africa |
| 2009 | Open | (South Africa) Eddie E Smith | (South Africa) Hubert Montgomery | (South Africa) Alex Gogos | Polokwane, South Africa |
| 2009 | Standard | (South Africa) Kolia, Muhammed (RSA) | (South Africa) Justin Peacock | (South Africa) Nazeem Khan | Polokwane, South Africa |
| 2009 | Production | (South Africa) Lurie, Eugene (RSA) | (South Africa) Jean J Engelbrecht | (South Africa) Albert Wessels | Polokwane, South Africa |
| 2012 | Open | (South Africa) Pierre P Wrogemann | (South Africa) Dirk D Becker | (South Africa) Jim J Vaughan | Bulawayo, Zimbabwe |
| 2012 | Standard | (South Africa) Muhammed M Kolia | (South Africa) Justin J Peacock | (South Africa) Heinrich H Dance | Bulawayo, Zimbabwe |
| 2015 | Open | (South Africa) Thomas Montgomery | (South Africa) Alex Gogos | (South Africa) Eddie Smith | Cape Town, South Africa |
| 2015 | Standard | (South Africa) Keith Rolls | (South Africa) Justin Peacock | (South Africa) Demis Karamitsos | Cape Town, South Africa |
| 2015 | Production | (South Africa) Heinrich Patzen | (South Africa) Thomas J Affleck | (South Africa) Shaun Ross | Cape Town, South Africa |
| 2015 | Classic | (South Africa) Albert Wessels | (South Africa) Johan Wheeler| | (South Africa) Jan Van den Berg | Cape Town, South Africa |

=== Lady category ===
| Year | Division | Gold | Silver | Bronze | Venue |
|---|---|---|---|---|---|
| 2003 | Open | (South Africa) Susan Kriel | (South Africa) Anne Smithers | (South Africa) Danette Van Der Linde | Pietersburg, South Africa |
| 2003 | Standard | (South Africa) Joey Fischer | (South Africa) Sebella O'Donovan | (South Africa) Eurika Du Plooy | Pietersburg, South Africa |
| 2006 | Open | (South Africa) Ets VandenBerg | (South Africa) Hanlie Montgomery | (South Africa) Susan Kriel | Johannesburg, South Africa |
| 2006 | Standard | (South Africa) Joey Fischer | (South Africa) Marie Victor | (South Africa) Janis Keaney | Johannesburg, South Africa |
| 2009 | Open | (South Africa) Van Den Berg, Ets E | (South Africa) Hanlie Montgomery | (South Africa) Chrishella Crause | Polokwane, South Africa |
| 2009 | Standard | (South Africa) Keaney, Janis (RSA) | (South Africa) Joey Fischer | (South Africa) Eurika Du Plooy | Polokwane, South Africa |
| 2012 | Standard | (Zimbabwe) Tara T Maidwell | (Zimbabwe) Chrissy C Atkinson | (Zimbabwe) Jo-Anne J Schultz | Bulawayo, Zimbabwe |
| 2015 | Open | (South Africa) Alexis Biermann | (South Africa) Ets Van Den Berg | (South Africa) Charlene Richings | Cape Town, South Africa |
| 2015 | Standard | (South Africa) Joey Fischer | (South Africa) Bernadette Remacle | (South Africa) Karen Shawe | Cape Town, South Africa |
| 2015 | Production | (South Africa) Carmen Sales | (South Africa) Frieda Alberts | (South Africa) Madelein Van Rensburg | Cape Town, South Africa |

=== Junior category ===
| Year | Division | Gold | Silver | Bronze | Venue |
|---|---|---|---|---|---|
| 2003 | Open | (South Africa) Louis Johann Meintjes | (South Africa) Vincendt Jacobs | (South Africa) William Meintjes | Pietersburg, South Africa |
| 2012 | Standard | (Zimbabwe) Bayley B Maidwell | (Zimbabwe) Blaise B Kay | (Zimbabwe) Aiden A Smith | Bulawayo, Zimbabwe |
| 2015 | Production | (South Africa) Thomas Affleck | (South Africa) Tristan Hopper | (South Africa) Divan Du Bruyn | Cape Town, South Africa |

=== Senior category ===
| Year | Division | Gold | Silver | Bronze | Venue |
|---|---|---|---|---|---|
| 2003 | Open | (South Africa) Carlo Belletti | (South Africa) Niko Min | (South Africa) Rodney Haycock | Pietersburg, South Africa |
| 2003 | Standard | (South Africa) Colin Amm | (South Africa) Roger Stockbridge | (South Africa) Kobus De Wet | Pietersburg, South Africa |
| 2006 | Open | (South Africa) Joel Cohen | (South Africa) Roger Stockbridge | (South Africa) Alf Hartzenburg | Johannesburg, South Africa |
| 2006 | Standard | (South Africa) Andre VanStraaten | (South Africa) Hein Kruger | (South Africa) Kobus DeWet | Johannesburg, South Africa |
| 2009 | Open | (South Africa) Montgomery, Hubert (RSA) | (South Africa) Jan J Van Den Berg | (South Africa) Goolam G Dadamia | Polokwane, South Africa |
| 2009 | Standard | (South Africa) Van Straaten, Andre (RSA) | (South Africa) Colin Amm | (South Africa) Kevin Rolls | Polokwane, South Africa |
| 2009 | Production | (South Africa) Rob Hopper | (South Africa) Gerrit Dokter | (South Africa) Henri Jonker | Polokwane, South Africa |
| 2012 | Open | (South Africa) Jim J Vaughan | (South Africa) Paul P Keaney | (South Africa) Peter P Holmes | Bulawayo, Zimbabwe |
| 2012 | Standard | (South Africa) Kevin K Rolls | (South Africa) Paul P Zorn | (South Africa) Andre A Van Tonder | Bulawayo, Zimbabwe |
| 2015 | Open | (South Africa) Hubert Montgomery | (South Africa) Goolam Dadamia | (South Africa) Justin Naidoo | Cape Town, South Africa |
| 2015 | Standard | (South Africa) Kevin Rolls | (South Africa) Abraham Jansen Van Vuuren | (South Africa) Khutbuddin Allie | Cape Town, South Africa |
| 2015 | Production | (South Africa) Zirk Pansegrouw | (South Africa) Hendrik Engelbrecht | (Namibia) Dirk Rohrmann | Cape Town, South Africa |
| 2015 | Classic | (South Africa) Jan Van Den Berg | (South Africa) Herman Steenkamp | (South Africa) Johann De Swardt | Cape Town, South Africa |

=== Super Senior category ===
| Year | Division | Gold | Silver | Bronze | Venue |
|---|---|---|---|---|---|
| 2009 | Open | (South Africa) Belletti, Carlo C (RSA) | (South Africa) Rodney R Haycock | (South Africa) Fanie Weyers | Polokwane, South Africa |
| 2009 | Standard | (South Africa) Johnny Johnson | (South Africa) Peet Delport | (South Africa) Willie Lubbe | Polokwane, South Africa |
| 2015 | Open | (South Africa) Carlo Belletti | (South Africa) Fanie Weyers | (South Africa) Mihrwaan Williams | Cape Town, South Africa |
| 2015 | Standard | (South Africa) Kobus De Wet | (South Africa) Andre Van Straaten | (South Africa) Riedewaan Scott | Cape Town, South Africa |
| 2015 | Production | (South Africa) Rob Hopper | (South Africa) Andy Fuller | (South Africa) Mark Versfeld | Cape Town, South Africa |
| 2015 | Classic | (South Africa) Johnny Johnson | (South Africa) Ludi Starke | (South Africa) Frank Taylor | Cape Town, South Africa |
