= European Championship =

Countries usually participating in European championships. Note the difference to the geographical borders of Europe.

A European Championship is the top level international sports competition between European athletes or sports teams representing their respective countries or professional sports clubs.

In the plural, the European Championships also refers to a specific combined quadrennial multi-sport event featuring the continental championships for athletics, aquatics, artistic gymnastics, triathlon, rowing, cycling and team golf.

Since European championships are usually open for teams or individual athletes from countries which are members of European sports organisations and some member countries are only partly or not at all situated in the European continent, some non-Europeans also usually take part in these championships. Traditionally, sports teams from Armenia, Georgia, Cyprus and Israel – all geographically outside Europe – are included in European competitions for cultural and political reasons, while trans-continental countries Azerbaijan, Russia, and Turkey (which straddle Europe and Asia), and technically Iceland (which sits on a continental fault line in the Atlantic ocean) and Malta (between Europe and Africa in the Mediterranean) also compete in Europe.

A number of countries maintain departments outside the European continent, but which are considered an integral part of their mother country, including France (e.g. Guadeloupe and New Caledonia), Denmark (Greenland), Spain (e.g. the Canaries) and the Netherlands (the former Netherlands Antilles). Athletes and club teams from these regions are typically eligible for European championships. The overseas territories of the United Kingdom, however, are usually not included unless an individual athlete has transferred allegiance completely to the UK or one of its home nations. The British overseas territory of Gibraltar competes separately in lower tier European championship competition in rugby union and football.

In addition, in football, under UEFA, but not in other sports, the Asian country of Kazakhstan also competes in European competition for historical reasons, while South African clubs participate in the top-level club championship in European rugby union called European Rugby Champions Cup.

The United Kingdom and Ireland compete in different configurations depending upon the sport in question; in team field sports, the home nations of England, Scotland, Wales and Ireland (a combined team from the Republic of Ireland and Northern Ireland) is the dominant configuration (except soccer and netball, where the two jurisdictions in Ireland compete separately), while in most individual sports, particularly Olympic sports, athletes represent 'Great Britain and Northern Ireland', often shortened to Great Britain (the description 'United Kingdom' is rarely used), and Ireland, with Northern Ireland athletes eligible for either.

== Games ==
- European Games
- European Championships
- European Youth Olympic Festival
- European Para Championships
- European Masters Games
- Winter X Games Europe

== Championships ==
American football

- European Championship of American football

Aquatics and water sports

- European Aquatics Championships
- European Short Course Swimming Championships
- European Water Polo Championship
- European Diving Championships
- European Masters Swimming Championships
- European Junior Swimming Championships
- World Para Swimming European Championships

Athletics

- European Athletics Championships
- European Athletics Indoor Championships
- European Athletics U23 Championships
- European Athletics U20 Championships
- European Athletics U18 Championships
- European Mountain Running Championships
- World Para Athletics European Championships

Australian rules football

- EU Cup
- AFL Europe Championship

Badminton

- European Badminton Championships

Baseball and softball

- European Men's Baseball Championship
- Women's European Baseball Championship
- Women's Softball European Championship

Bandy

- Davos Cup
- European Cup (for club teams)

Basketball

- EuroBasket
- EuroBasket Women

Biathlon

- Biathlon European Championships

Boxing

- European Amateur Boxing Championships

Brazilian jiu-jitsu

- European Championship (Brazilian jiu-jitsu)

Canoeing

- Canoe Sprint European Championships
- European Canoe Slalom Championships

Chess

- European Individual Chess Championship

Cricket

- European Cricket Championship
- European Twenty20 Championship
- Women's European Cricket Championship
- European Affiliates Championship

Curling

- European Curling Championships

Cycling

- BMX: European BMX Championships
- Cyclo-cross: UEC European Cyclo-cross Championships
- Mountain bike: European Mountain Bike Championships
- Road cycling: European Road Cycling Championships
- Track cycling: UEC European Track Championships

Darts

- European Championship (darts)

Dragon Boat

- European Dragon Boat Championships

Equestrian

- European Dressage Championships
- European Eventing Championships
- European Show Jumping Championships

Fencing

- World Fencing Championships, open only to European fencers from 1921 to 1937
- European Fencing Championships

Field hockey

- Men's EuroHockey Championship
- Women's EuroHockey Championship

Fistball

- Fistball European Championships

Flag football

- IFAF European Flag Football Championship

Football and beach soccer

- UEFA European Championship
- UEFA Women's Championship
- Euro Beach Soccer League

Futsal

- UEFA Futsal Championship
- UEFA Women's Futsal Championship
- UEFS Futsal Men's Championship
- UEFS Futsal Women's Championship

Go

- European Go Championship

Gymnastics

- Aerobic Gymnastics European Championships
- European Acrobatics Championships
- European Men's Artistic Gymnastics Championships
- European TeamGym Championships
- European Trampoline Championships
- European Women's Artistic Gymnastics Championships
- Rhythmic Gymnastics European Championships

Handball and beach handball

- European Men's Handball Championship
- European Women's Handball Championship
- European Beach Handball Championship
- European Wheelchair Handball Nations' Tournament

Indoor hockey

- Men's EuroHockey Indoor Championship
- Women's EuroHockey Indoor Championship

Judo

- European Judo Championships

Karate

- European Karate Championships

Kickboxing

- WAKO Amateur European Championships

Korfball

- European Korfball Championship

Minifootball

- EMF EURO

Motorsport and motorcycle sport

- AIACR European Championship (1931–1939)
- European Formula Two Championship (1967–1984)
- European Touring Car Championship (1963–1988; 2000–2004)
- European Rally Championship
- FIA European Rallycross Championship
- FIA GT3 European Championship
- Individual Speedway European Championship
- European Pairs Speedway Championship
- European Speedway Club Champions' Cup

Multi-sport

- European Championships
- European Games
- European Youth Olympic Festival

Pétanque

- European Pétanque Championships

Pitch and putt

- European Pitch and putt Championship

Professional wrestling

- WWE European Championship
- wXw European Championship

Quidditch

- European Games (quidditch)

Racquetball

- European Racquetball Championships

Rink hockey

- Rink Hockey European Championship

Rowing

- European Rowing Championships

Rugby league

- Rugby League European Championship

Rugby union

- Rugby Europe International Championships

Sailing

- European Sailing Championships

Savate

- European Savate Championships

Shooting

- European Shooting Championships

Snooker

- EBSA European Snooker Championship

Squash

- European Squash Individual Championships
- European Squash Team Championships

Sumo

- European Sumo Championships

Table tennis

- European Table Tennis Championships
- European Para Table Tennis Championships

Taekwondo

- European Taekwondo Championships

Triathlon

- Europe Triathlon Championships

Volleyball and beach volleyball

- Men's European Volleyball Championship
- Women's European Volleyball Championship
- European Beach Volleyball Championship

Weightlifting

- European Weightlifting Championships

Wheelchair rugby

- IWRF European Championship

Wrestling

- European Wrestling Championships

== Winter sports ==
1. European Figure Skating Championships
2. European Speed Skating Championships
3. European Short Track Speed Skating Championships
4. FIL European Luge Championships
5. Bobsleigh and Skeleton European Championship
6. Biathlon European Championships
7. European Championships of Ski Mountaineering
8. European Ski Orienteering Championships
9. European Curling Championships
10. Ice Hockey European Championships
11. Women's Ice Hockey European Championships
12. World Para Ice Hockey European Championships
13. European Snowboard Championships
14. European Freestyle Skiing Championships
15. FIS Alpine Ski Europa Cup
16. European Ski Marathon Championships
17. European Snow Volleyball Championships (CEV EuroSnowVolley)
18. European Bandy Championships
19. European Winter Triathlon Championships
20. European Ice Climbing Championships
21. European Snowshoe Championships
22. European Grass Skiing Championship
23. European Rollerski Championships
24. European Snowcross Championship
25. European Snowmobile Championship - Snowmobile Enduro European Cup

== See also ==
- Championship
- Eurogames (disambiguation)
- European Games, a multi-sport event between competitors from all nations in Europe
- European Junior Championships (disambiguation)
- European Open (disambiguation)
- European Masters (disambiguation)
- World championship
  - African Championship
  - Asian Championship
  - Oceania Championship
  - Pan American Championship
    - Central American Championships (disambiguation)
    - North American Championship
    - South American Championship
