= Higher Education European Masters =

Erasmus Mundus Program

The Higher Education European Masters is an Erasmus Mundus program which focuses on the functions, policies, and operations of higher education. Professor Peter Maassen, a professor at the University of Oslo and also a research professor at NIFU-STEP, was instrumental in the conceptualisation of the programme. The program was among the first to acquire an Erasmus Mundus European Masters label of the European Union in 2004.

The students are able to study developments within higher education as taught by leading lights in the field. Moreover, they are also have an opportunity to experience three different university systems as they pursue their mobility scheme. Non-European students may be awarded scholarships as part of the Erasmus Mundus programme.

== Consortium institutions ==
HEEM is offered by a consortium of three universities;

- University of Oslo in Norway (Institute of Educational Research),
- University of Tampere in Finland
- University of Aveiro in Portugal

Moreover, other universities and academic organisations are involved in the program, including Obirin University in Japan and the Center for Higher Education Policy Studies (CHEPS) in Netherlands.

== Mobility scheme ==
The programme consists of four semesters and is fully taught in English. The first semester at the University of Oslo provides the students with an introduction to the history, philosophy, theories, concepts and disciplinary perspectives for studying higher education. It also includes an introduction to social science research methods. In the second semester at University of Helsinki and third semester at University of Aveiro, students further pursue studies in research methods as well as in-depth focus on change in higher education from various perspectives such as management, administration, internationalisation and economics. This is provided in modules developed and taught by various faculty members in the involved institutions. In the third semester, students commence working on their thesis. The fourth semester is spent researching on and writing the Masters thesis at one of the consortium universities, depending on the student's area of research.

== Admission requirements ==
Admission is based on;

- A three-year university degree (bachelor degree), or an equivalent approved by the program committee
- A good command of academic English
- A statement of purpose and research interest.

== Tuition fees and funding ==
There are three categories of applicants; self-financed, European students and third-country scholarship applicants. For application as a third-country scholarship student, one must meet the eligibility criteria for an Erasmus Mundus scholarship. European students have a chance to obtain a scholarship funded by the Hedda association. Moreover, European students have a chance to receive funding to spend one semester at a partner university outside of Europe, in HEEM's case, Obirin University in Japan. For the class of 2007–2009, 20 Erasmus Mundus scholarships and 5 Hedda scholarships for European students were available.

== Degrees awarded ==
The University of Oslo, on behalf of the consortium, awards a joint degree entitled European Masters in Higher Education and a diploma which enumerates the course content and the students achievements. The University of Tampere also awards a degree entitled Master of Administrative Science. The degree is issued in Finnish but an English language diploma is in Finnish.
