= European Open =

Sporting events called the European Open include:

- Disc Golf European Open, a PDGA major disc golf tournament
- European Open (golf), a golf tournament on the European Tour
- Ladies European Open (golf), Ladies European Tour
- Colgate European Open (golf), LPGA tour, women's golf tournament
- European Open (judo), European judo tournament
- European Open (real tennis), a defunct real tennis tournament at Lord's Cricket Ground
- European Open (snooker), a professional snooker tournament
- European Open (tennis), a 250 Series ATP tournament since 2016 in Belgium
- WTA Swiss Open (tennis), a defunct WTA tennis tournament, in its latter years it was titled as the European Open

== See also ==
- Hamburg European Open (formerly German Open) ATP men's tennis
- Euroformula Open Championship (motorsports)
- European Championship (disambiguation)
- European Masters (disambiguation)
- Open Europe (disambiguation)
