= Philippe Quintais =

French pétanque player (born 1967)

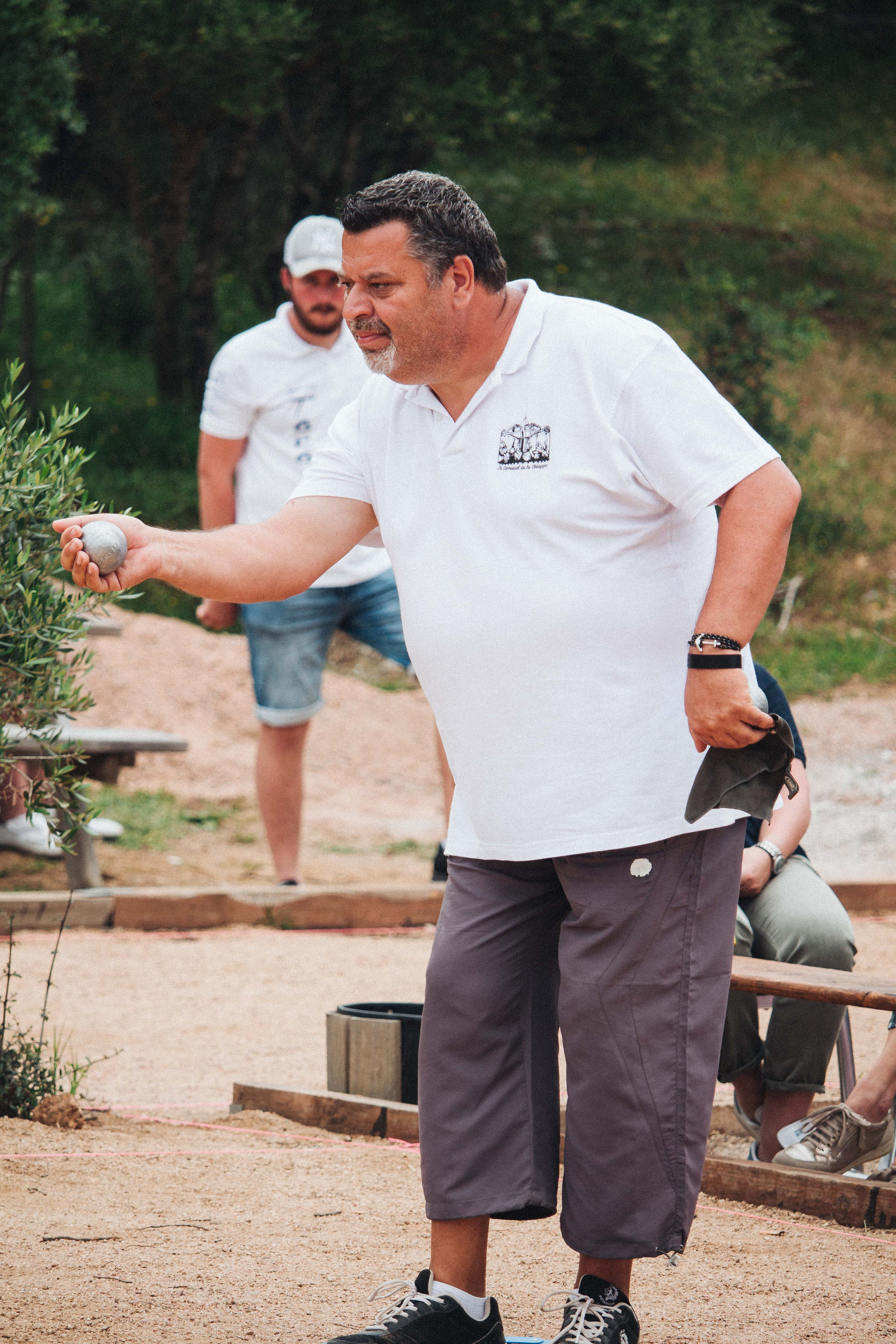

Personal information
- Born: 30 December 1967 (age 57) Chartres

Sport
- Sport: pétanque

Philippe Quintais (born 30 December 1967 in Chartres) is a French Elite category pétanque player, 14 times world champion. He is right-handed. He is of Portuguese descent.

== Biography ==
Philippe started playing Petanque at 3 years old with his parents. Quite soon he became one of the best shooter of his generation. At international level he won four gold world medals in Precision shooting in 2000, 2001, 2002 and 2003; including eight gold models and four bronze medals at the Triple World Championship. He also coached the French world champions of 2007 and 2008.

With his team mates Philippe Suchaud and Henry Lacroix, they entered the world petanque legend under the nickname "Dream Team," winning multiple France nationals championships as well as International Competitions including 3 world Championship in a row with the support of 4th player Eric Sirot in 2001, 2002, 2003.

He played in the clubs of Hanches, Star Master's, Duc de Nice and lately Dreux.

He is also Sport ambassador for the city of Dreux since 2009.

== Awards ==
=== France Championships ===
- 2 times Single (Tête-à-Tête) French champion: 1988, 2001.
- 2 times Double (Doublette) French champion: 1999, 2007.
- 5 times Triple (Triplette) French champion: 2006, 2008, 2009, 2010, 2013.
- 3 times Mix-Double French champion: 1993, 1994, 2008.

=== World Championships ===
- 8 times Triple World Champion:

Andorra 1991 / Chiang Mai 1993 (Thailand) / Brussels 1995 (Belgique) / Essen 1996 (Germany) / Maspalomas 1998 (Spain) / Monaco 2001 / Grenoble 2002 (France) / Geneva 2003 (Switzerland) / Desbiens 2018 (Canada).

- 4 times Precision Shooting World Champion:

São Brás de Alportel 2000 (Portugal) / Monaco 2001 / Grenoble 2002 (France) / Geneva 2003 (Switzerland)

- 2 times World Champion as Coach :

Pattaya 2007 (Thailand) / Dakar 2008 (Senegal)

=== Mediterranean Games ===
- Gold Medal in Double with Philippe Suchaud : 2001 (Algiers);
- Silver Medal in Double with Pascal Milei : 2009 (Pescara);
- Silver Medal in Triple with Philippe Suchaud and Ludovic Labrue : 2001 (Louviers);
- Bronze Medal in Double with Philippe Suchaud : 1997 (Bari).

=== Other achievements ===
- 5 wins in French Clubs Cup (1 with Hanches and 4 with D.U.C de Nice).
- 12 wins in Mondial de Millau (5 times in triples, 2 times in doubles and 5 times in tête-à-tête).
- 5 triumphs in La Marseillaise à Pétanque : 1997, 2003, 2004, 2008 and 2009
- 5 victories in Masters de Pétanque: 2003, 2007, 2010, 2013, 2015.
- 61 times selected for French Championships including around 150 wins.
- Record in the hour-shooting: 991 boules/1000.
