= European Junior Championships =

The European Junior Championships can refer to:

- European Junior Alpine Skiing Championships
- EFAF European Junior Championship, biennial American football tournament
- European Athletics Junior Championships
- European Junior Badminton Championships
- European Junior Baseball Championship
- European Junior Boxing Championships
- European Junior Chess Championship
- European Junior Equestrian Vaulting Championships
- European Cadet and Junior Fencing Championships
- Finswimming European Junior Championship
- European Men's Junior Handball Championship (under-20)
- Women's European Junior Handball Championship (under-20)
- IIHF European Junior Championships, defunct ice hockey tournament
- European Junior Judo Championships
- European Junior Natural Track Luge Championships
- EBSA European Under-21 Snooker Championships
- European Softball Junior Boys Championship
- European Softball Junior Girls Championship
- Individual Speedway Junior European Championship (under-19)
- Team Speedway Junior European Championship (under-19)
- European Rowing Junior Championships (under-18)
- European Junior Squash Championships (under-19)
- European Junior Swimming Championships
- European Junior Taekwondo Championships
- Tennis European Junior Championships
- Men's Junior European Volleyball Championship (under-21)
- Women's Junior European Volleyball Championship (under-20)
- European Junior Wrestling Championships
- European Junior Tennis Championships (18/16/14 & Under)
- European Youth Table Tennis Championships

== See also ==
- European Championship
- European Champion Clubs Cup for Junior
- European Junior Curling Challenge
- European Trophy Junior
- European Junior Cup
