= Ju-jitsu at the 2016 Asian Beach Games =

Asian Beach Games event

- Venue: Biển Đông Park
- Dates: 25–27 September 2016

Ju-jitsu competition at the 2016 Asian Beach Games was held in Danang, Vietnam from 25 to 27 September 2016 at Bien Dong Park.

== Medalists ==
=== Duo show ===
Event	Gold	Silver	Bronze
Men	Thailand; Thammanun Pothaisong; Warut Netpong	Turkmenistan; Ýusup Taňryberdiýew; Ahmet Taňryberdiýew	Vietnam; Trần Cao Trọng; Nguyễn Hồng Quân
Men	Thailand; Thammanun Pothaisong; Warut Netpong	Turkmenistan; Ýusup Taňryberdiýew; Ahmet Taňryberdiýew	Thailand; Jirayut Wuttiwannaphong; Jirayu Vongsawan
Women	Vietnam; Hoàng Thị Lan Hương; Nguyễn Minh Phương	Thailand; Suphawadee Kaeosrasaen; Kunsatri Kumsroi	Vietnam; Đỗ Thu Hà; Đào Lê Thu Trang
Women	Vietnam; Hoàng Thị Lan Hương; Nguyễn Minh Phương	Thailand; Suphawadee Kaeosrasaen; Kunsatri Kumsroi	Pakistan; Humaira Ashiq; Maryam
Mixed	Thailand; Ratcharat Yimprai; Arreewan Chansri	Vietnam; Trần Thanh Lâm; Nguyễn Phương Uyên	Pakistan; Shahzeb Nawaz Janjua; Maryam
Mixed	Thailand; Ratcharat Yimprai; Arreewan Chansri	Vietnam; Trần Thanh Lâm; Nguyễn Phương Uyên	Vietnam; Nguyễn Hồng Quân; Nguyễn Minh Phương

=== Men's ne-waza ===
Event	Gold	Silver	Bronze
−56 kg	Ölziitogtokhyn Erdenebaatar; Mongolia	Jahanzeb Rashad Lone; Pakistan	Khalifa Nassrati; United Arab Emirates
−56 kg	Ölziitogtokhyn Erdenebaatar; Mongolia	Jahanzeb Rashad Lone; Pakistan	Payoongsak Singchalad; Thailand
−62 kg	Amir Yahya; Iraq	Gian Dee; Philippines	Jarrah Al-Hazza; Independent Olympic Athletes
−62 kg	Amir Yahya; Iraq	Gian Dee; Philippines	Sarawut Petsing; Thailand
−69 kg	Talib Al-Kirbi; United Arab Emirates	Ali Ahmed; Iraq	Amir Hamza; Pakistan
−69 kg	Talib Al-Kirbi; United Arab Emirates	Ali Ahmed; Iraq	Amir Hossein Khademian; Iran
−77 kg	Ali Munfaredi; Bahrain	Hamzeh Al-Rasheed; Jordan	Abdelkarim Al-Rasheed; Jordan
−77 kg	Ali Munfaredi; Bahrain	Hamzeh Al-Rasheed; Jordan	Murtazali Murtazaliev; Kyrgyzstan
−85 kg	Haidar Al-Rasheed; Jordan	Khalfan Balhol; United Arab Emirates	Mohammad Al-Bilbaisi; Jordan
−85 kg	Haidar Al-Rasheed; Jordan	Khalfan Balhol; United Arab Emirates	Saoud Al-Hammadi; United Arab Emirates
−94 kg	Faisal Al-Ketbi; United Arab Emirates	Basel Fanous; Jordan	Muhammad Abid; Pakistan
−94 kg	Faisal Al-Ketbi; United Arab Emirates	Basel Fanous; Jordan	Baasandorjiin Ariuntsog; Mongolia
+94 kg	Yahya Al-Hammadi; United Arab Emirates	Ahmed Butt; Pakistan	Alla Issa; Iraq
+94 kg	Yahya Al-Hammadi; United Arab Emirates	Ahmed Butt; Pakistan	Boldpüreviin Önörbat; Mongolia
Openweight	Yahya Al-Hammadi; United Arab Emirates	Faisal Al-Ketbi; United Arab Emirates	Basel Fanous; Jordan
Openweight	Yahya Al-Hammadi; United Arab Emirates	Faisal Al-Ketbi; United Arab Emirates	Haidar Al-Rasheed; Jordan

=== Women's ne-waza ===
Event	Gold	Silver	Bronze
−45 kg	Meggie Ochoa; Philippines	Suwanan Boonsorn; Thailand	Đỗ Thu Hà; Vietnam
−45 kg	Meggie Ochoa; Philippines	Suwanan Boonsorn; Thailand	Wadima Al-Yafei; United Arab Emirates
−49 kg	Varaporn Poorisrisak; Thailand	Tô Thị Trang; Vietnam	Dương Thị Thanh Minh; Vietnam
−49 kg	Varaporn Poorisrisak; Thailand	Tô Thị Trang; Vietnam	Ulýana Kudinowa; Turkmenistan
−55 kg	Annie Ramirez; Philippines	Siramol Deepudsa; Thailand	Angelina Filippowa; Turkmenistan
−55 kg	Annie Ramirez; Philippines	Siramol Deepudsa; Thailand	Kaila Napolis; Philippines
−62 kg	Battsogtyn Buyandelger; Mongolia	Ruba Al-Sayegh; Jordan	Orapa Senatham; Thailand
−62 kg	Battsogtyn Buyandelger; Mongolia	Ruba Al-Sayegh; Jordan	Apryl Eppinger; Philippines
−70 kg	Rana Qubbaj; Jordan	Tsogt-Ochiryn Battsetseg; Mongolia	Onanong Sangsirichok; Thailand
−70 kg	Rana Qubbaj; Jordan	Tsogt-Ochiryn Battsetseg; Mongolia	Beenish Khan; Pakistan
+70 kg	Luma Qubbaj; Jordan	Đào Thị Thảo Nguyên; Vietnam	Đỗ Thị Hoài Uyên; Vietnam
+70 kg	Luma Qubbaj; Jordan	Đào Thị Thảo Nguyên; Vietnam	Myagmaryn Sugar; Mongolia
Openweight	Luma Qubbaj; Jordan	Tsogt-Ochiryn Battsetseg; Mongolia	Rana Qubbaj; Jordan
Openweight	Luma Qubbaj; Jordan	Tsogt-Ochiryn Battsetseg; Mongolia	Battsogtyn Buyandelger; Mongolia

== Medal table ==
Rank	Nation	Gold	Silver	Bronze	Total
1	Jordan (JOR)	4	3	5	12
2	United Arab Emirates (UAE)	4	2	3	9
3	Thailand (THA)	3	3	5	11
4	Mongolia (MGL)	2	2	4	8
5	Philippines (PHI)	2	1	2	5
6	Vietnam (VIE)	1	3	6	10
7	Iraq (IRQ)	1	1	1	3
8	Bahrain (BRN)	1	0	0	1
9	Pakistan (PAK)	0	2	5	7
10	Turkmenistan (TKM)	0	1	2	3
11	Independent Olympic Athletes (IOA)	0	0	1	1
11	Iran (IRI)	0	0	1	1
11	Kyrgyzstan (KGZ)	0	0	1	1
Totals (13 entries)		18	18	36	72

== Results ==
=== Duo show ===
==== Men ====
26 September

Round of 16
Trần Thanh Lâm (VIE); Nguyễn Thành An (VIE)	39.5
Krishna Kumar Sana (IND); Vinay Kumar Joshi (IND)	34.0
Rafique Siddique (PAK); Shahzeb Nawaz Janjua (PAK)	118.0
Jirayut Wuttiwannaphong (THA); Jirayu Vongsawan (THA)	119.5
Kevin Nicolaos (LIB); Jad Fadel (LIB)
Lin Yi-chao (TPE); Liao Po-yu (TPE)	WO
Ýusup Taňryberdiýew (TKM); Ahmet Taňryberdiýew (TKM)	37.5
Mehran Sattar (IRI); Ahmad Reza Eidi (IRI)	35.5
Prabudda Jayasanka (SRI); Dinesh Ambegoda (SRI)
Abu Hurraira Dhanani (PAK); Muhammad Ammar (PAK)	WO
Trần Cao Trọng (VIE); Nguyễn Hồng Quân (VIE)	39.5
Kerimberdi Döwletow (TKM); Mekan Nurjikow (TKM)	35.5
Balakrishna Shekhar Shetty (IND); Mukesh Rane (IND)	36.5
Thammanun Pothaisong (THA); Warut Netpong (THA)	40.0

Quarterfinals
Trần Thanh Lâm (VIE); Nguyễn Thành An (VIE)	37.5
Jirayut Wuttiwannaphong (THA); Jirayu Vongsawan (THA)	38.5
Lin Yi-chao (TPE); Liao Po-yu (TPE)	33.5
Ýusup Taňryberdiýew (TKM); Ahmet Taňryberdiýew (TKM)	36.0
Abu Hurraira Dhanani (PAK); Muhammad Ammar (PAK)	39.0
Trần Cao Trọng (VIE); Nguyễn Hồng Quân (VIE)	41.5
Mohanad Hasan (IRQ); Mahmood Yaseen (IRQ)	36.0
Thammanun Pothaisong (THA); Warut Netpong (THA)	40.5

Semifinals
Jirayut Wuttiwannaphong (THA); Jirayu Vongsawan (THA)	76.5
Ýusup Taňryberdiýew (TKM); Ahmet Taňryberdiýew (TKM)	77.0
Trần Cao Trọng (VIE); Nguyễn Hồng Quân (VIE)	40.0
Thammanun Pothaisong (THA); Warut Netpong (THA)	40.5

Gold medal
Ýusup Taňryberdiýew (TKM); Ahmet Taňryberdiýew (TKM)	45.0
Thammanun Pothaisong (THA); Warut Netpong (THA)	48.5

Repechage
Trần Thanh Lâm (VIE); Nguyễn Thành An (VIE)	38.5
Lin Yi-chao (TPE); Liao Po-yu (TPE)	34.5
Abu Hurraira Dhanani (PAK); Muhammad Ammar (PAK)	39.5
Mohanad Hasan (IRQ); Mahmood Yaseen (IRQ)	35.5

Bronze medals
Trần Thanh Lâm (VIE); Nguyễn Thành An (VIE)	40.0
Trần Cao Trọng (VIE); Nguyễn Hồng Quân (VIE)	41.5
Abu Hurraira Dhanani (PAK); Muhammad Ammar (PAK)	39.5
Jirayut Wuttiwannaphong (THA); Jirayu Vongsawan (THA)	42.0

==== Women ====
25 September

Quarterfinals
Humaira Ashiq (PAK); Maryam (PAK)	36.0
Bhagyashree Bonde (IND); Ratnadiptee Shimpi (IND)	30.5
Ambreen Masih (PAK); Kashaf Javed (PAK)	33.0
Đỗ Thu Hà (VIE); Đào Lê Thu Trang (VIE)	39.5

Semifinals
Humaira Ashiq (PAK); Maryam (PAK)	36.0
Hoàng Thị Lan Hương (VIE); Nguyễn Minh Phương (VIE)	40.0
Đỗ Thu Hà (VIE); Đào Lê Thu Trang (VIE)	38.0
Suphawadee Kaeosrasaen (THA); Kunsatri Kumsroi (THA)	40.0

Gold medal
Hoàng Thị Lan Hương (VIE); Nguyễn Minh Phương (VIE)	39.5
Suphawadee Kaeosrasaen (THA); Kunsatri Kumsroi (THA)	38.5

Bronze medals
Bhagyashree Bonde (IND); Ratnadiptee Shimpi (IND)
Đỗ Thu Hà (VIE); Đào Lê Thu Trang (VIE)	WO
Ambreen Masih (PAK); Kashaf Javed (PAK)	33.5
Humaira Ashiq (PAK); Maryam (PAK)	38.0

==== Mixed ====
27 September

Round of 16
Ratcharat Yimprai (THA); Arreewan Chansri (THA)	40.0
Mekan Nurjikow (TKM); Gowher Atdaýewa (TKM)	34.5
Trần Thanh Lâm (VIE); Nguyễn Phương Uyên (VIE)	37.0
Ahmet Taňryberdiýew (TKM); Ulýana Kudinowa (TKM)	31.0

Quarterfinals
Nguyễn Hồng Quân (VIE); Nguyễn Minh Phương (VIE)	37.0
Kevin Nicolaos (LIB); Lea Farhat (LIB)	34.0
Ratcharat Yimprai (THA); Arreewan Chansri (THA)	39.5
Rafique Siddique (PAK); Humaira Ashiq (PAK)	37.5
Abhijeet Sharad More (IND); Ratnadiptee Shimpi (IND)
Trần Thanh Lâm (VIE); Nguyễn Phương Uyên (VIE)	WO
Shahzeb Nawaz Janjua (PAK); Maryam (PAK)	WO
Mahmood Yaseen (IRQ); Hajir Mohammed (IRQ)

Semifinals
Nguyễn Hồng Quân (VIE); Nguyễn Minh Phương (VIE)	46.5
Ratcharat Yimprai (THA); Arreewan Chansri (THA)	47.0
Trần Thanh Lâm (VIE); Nguyễn Phương Uyên (VIE)	47.0
Shahzeb Nawaz Janjua (PAK); Maryam (PAK)	46.0

Gold medal
Ratcharat Yimprai (THA); Arreewan Chansri (THA)	49.0
Trần Thanh Lâm (VIE); Nguyễn Phương Uyên (VIE)	48.5

Repechage
Kevin Nicolaos (LIB); Lea Farhat (LIB)	35.5
Rafique Siddique (PAK); Humaira Ashiq (PAK)	40.0
Abhijeet Sharad More (IND); Ratnadiptee Shimpi (IND)	WO
Mahmood Yaseen (IRQ); Hajir Mohammed (IRQ)

Bronze medals
Rafique Siddique (PAK); Humaira Ashiq (PAK)
Shahzeb Nawaz Janjua (PAK); Maryam (PAK)	WO
Abhijeet Sharad More (IND); Ratnadiptee Shimpi (IND)
Nguyễn Hồng Quân (VIE); Nguyễn Minh Phương (VIE)	WO

=== Men's ne-waza ===
==== 56 kg ====
26 September

Round of 16
Ölziitogtokhyn Erdenebaatar (MGL)	13
Susovan Ghosh (IND)	0
Mahmood Ismael (IRQ)	4
Đào Hồng Sơn (VIE)	2
Mehran Sattar (IRI)	DQ
Ýusup Taňryberdiýew (TKM)
Payoongsak Singchalad (THA)	DQ
Shamshod Emomov (TJK)
Cần Văn Thắng (VIE)	0
Khalifa Nassrati (UAE)	4
Prabudda Jayasanka (SRI)	0
Jahanzeb Rashad Lone (PAK)	100

Quarterfinals
Ölziitogtokhyn Erdenebaatar (MGL)	100
Mahmood Ismael (IRQ)	0
Mehran Sattar (IRI)	WD
Rafique Siddique (PAK)
Payoongsak Singchalad (THA)	2
Khalifa Nassrati (UAE)	14
Jahanzeb Rashad Lone (PAK)	100
Sunny Hareram Khatri (IND)	0

Semifinals
Ölziitogtokhyn Erdenebaatar (MGL)	12
Mehran Sattar (IRI)	0
Khalifa Nassrati (UAE)	0
Jahanzeb Rashad Lone (PAK)	4

Gold medal
Ölziitogtokhyn Erdenebaatar (MGL)	0
Jahanzeb Rashad Lone (PAK)	0

Repechage
Mahmood Ismael (IRQ)	2
Rafique Siddique (PAK)	4
Payoongsak Singchalad (THA)	100
Sunny Hareram Khatri (IND)	0

Bronze medals
Rafique Siddique (PAK)	0
Khalifa Nassrati (UAE)	100
Payoongsak Singchalad (THA)	100
Mehran Sattar (IRI)	6

==== 62 kg ====
25 September

Round of 32
Phan Trúc Phi (VIE)	0–0	Kerimberdi Döwletow (TKM)
Umar Mukhtar (PAK)	DQ	Morteza Hoseini (AFG)

Round of 16
Zayed Al-Mansoori (UAE)	8
Lovedeep Bagga (IND)	0
Sarawut Petsing (THA)	100
Ghady Moussa (LIB)	0
Nursulton Bozorov (TJK)
Gian Dee (PHI)	DQ
Phan Trúc Phi (VIE)	0
Jarrah Al-Hazza (IOA)	6
Lê Trọng Hoàng (VIE)	7
Amir Yahya (IRQ)	8
Ahmad Reza Eidi (IRI)	13
Ahmet Taňryberdiýew (TKM)	0
Phuwadech Bualuang (THA)	100
Mukesh Rane (IND)	0
Umar Mukhtar (PAK)	100
Sultan Al-Dhaheri (UAE)	11

Quarterfinals
Zayed Al-Mansoori (UAE)	0
Sarawut Petsing (THA)	5
Gian Dee (PHI)	100
Jarrah Al-Hazza (IOA)	0
Amir Yahya (IRQ)	100
Ahmad Reza Eidi (IRI)	0
Phuwadech Bualuang (THA)	4
Umar Mukhtar (PAK)	8

Semifinals
Sarawut Petsing (THA)	2
Gian Dee (PHI)	2
Amir Yahya (IRQ)	100
Umar Mukhtar (PAK)	0

Gold medal
Gian Dee (PHI)	2
Amir Yahya (IRQ)	4

Repechage
Zayed Al-Mansoori (UAE)	0
Jarrah Al-Hazza (IOA)	100
Ahmad Reza Eidi (IRI)	18
Phuwadech Bualuang (THA)	0

Bronze medals
Jarrah Al-Hazza (IOA)	14
Umar Mukhtar (PAK)	0
Ahmad Reza Eidi (IRI)	0
Sarawut Petsing (THA)	2

==== 69 kg ====
25 September

Round of 16
Lê Tiến Thành (VIE)	0
Marc Lim (PHI)	2
Komil Boymurodov (TJK)
Andrew Canday (IND)	DQ
Talib Al-Kirbi (UAE)	100
Sarut Taithanee (THA)	2
Amir Hamza (PAK)	10
Ihsan Falah (IRQ)	6
Amir Hossein Khademian (IRI)	100
Anjan Raman (IND)	0
Ali Ahmed (IRQ)	9
Nartay Kazhekov (KAZ)	2
Jawid Rasoli (AFG)
Mönkhtöriin Davaadorj (MGL)	DQ
Nurkalyi Mirlanov (KGZ)	4
Phạm Trí Dũng (VIE)	5

Quarterfinals
Marc Lim (PHI)	100
Andrew Canday (IND)	0
Talib Al-Kirbi (UAE)	2
Amir Hamza (PAK)	0
Amir Hossein Khademian (IRI)	0
Ali Ahmed (IRQ)	16
Mönkhtöriin Davaadorj (MGL)	0
Phạm Trí Dũng (VIE)	0

Semifinals
Marc Lim (PHI)	2
Talib Al-Kirbi (UAE)	6
Ali Ahmed (IRQ)	100
Phạm Trí Dũng (VIE)	0

Gold medal
Talib Al-Kirbi (UAE)	6
Ali Ahmed (IRQ)	0

Repechage
Andrew Canday (IND)	0
Amir Hamza (PAK)	100
Amir Hossein Khademian (IRI)	100
Mönkhtöriin Davaadorj (MGL)	0

Bronze medals
Amir Hamza (PAK)	100
Phạm Trí Dũng (VIE)	0
Amir Hossein Khademian (IRI)	100
Marc Lim (PHI)	2

==== 77 kg ====
26 September

Round of 32
Hansel Co (PHI)	2–99	Ali Munfaredi (BRN)
Mahdi Ebrahimi (AFG)	DQ	Murtazali Murtazaliev (KGZ)
Salem Al-Suwaidi (UAE)	2–2	Nguyễn Anh Tùng (VIE)
Marat Kutzhanov (KAZ)	DQ	Abdul Wasae Dourandish (AFG)
Khuasangiin Oyuunbat (MGL)	2–10	Nguyễn Văn Tuấn (VIE)

Round of 16
Abdelkarim Al-Rasheed (JOR)	WD
Mahmood Yaseen (IRQ)
Ali Munfaredi (BRN)	100
Chaitanya Gavali (IND)	0
Murtazali Murtazaliev (KGZ)	2
Sanjmyatavyn Bayartüvshin (MGL)	0
Nguyễn Anh Tùng (VIE)	100
Shahzeb Nawaz Janjua (PAK)	0
Mekan Nurjikow (TKM)	0
Mohamed Al-Qubaisi (UAE)	100
Marat Kutzhanov (KAZ)	100
Vinay Kumar Joshi (IND)	0
Hamzeh Al-Rasheed (JOR)	100
Sufyan Nadhim (IRQ)	0
Nguyễn Văn Tuấn (VIE)	0
Banpot Lertthaisong (THA)	100

Quarterfinals
Abdelkarim Al-Rasheed (JOR)	0
Ali Munfaredi (BRN)	4
Murtazali Murtazaliev (KGZ)	100
Nguyễn Anh Tùng (VIE)	0
Mohamed Al-Qubaisi (UAE)	2
Marat Kutzhanov (KAZ)	0
Hamzeh Al-Rasheed (JOR)	100
Banpot Lertthaisong (THA)	0

Semifinals
Ali Munfaredi (BRN)	8
Murtazali Murtazaliev (KGZ)	6
Mohamed Al-Qubaisi (UAE)	0
Hamzeh Al-Rasheed (JOR)	2

Gold medal
Ali Munfaredi (BRN)	2
Hamzeh Al-Rasheed (JOR)	0

Repechage
Abdelkarim Al-Rasheed (JOR)	100
Nguyễn Anh Tùng (VIE)	0
Marat Kutzhanov (KAZ)	12
Banpot Lertthaisong (THA)	0

Bronze medals
Abdelkarim Al-Rasheed (JOR)	100
Mohamed Al-Qubaisi (UAE)	0
Marat Kutzhanov (KAZ)	0
Murtazali Murtazaliev (KGZ)	5

==== 85 kg ====
25 September

Round of 32
Saoud Al-Hammadi (UAE)	4–0	Kevin Nicolaos (LIB)
Abdughafur Abdulloev (TJK)	99–3	Dörtguly Jumaýew (TKM)
Froilan Sarenas (PHI)	0–3	Mohammad Al-Bilbaisi (JOR)

Round of 16
Abhijeet Sharad More (IND)	0
Sooknatee Suntra (THA)	100
Saoud Al-Hammadi (UAE)	2
Batmönkhiin Altansükh (MGL)	0
Murtadha Kamal (IRQ)	0
Haidar Al-Rasheed (JOR)	100
Abdughafur Abdulloev (TJK)	100
Hoàng Mạnh Tùng (VIE)	2
Balakrishna Shekhar Shetty (IND)	0
Abdurahmanhaji Murtazaliev (KGZ)	100
Khalfan Balhol (UAE)	DQ
Ngô Văn Kiên (VIE)
Döwletmyrat Kasymow (TKM)	0
Mohammad Mansouri Davar (IRI)	100
Mohammad Al-Bilbaisi (JOR)	100
Mohanad Hasan (IRQ)	0

Quarterfinals
Sooknatee Suntra (THA)	5
Saoud Al-Hammadi (UAE)	8
Haidar Al-Rasheed (JOR)	100
Abdughafur Abdulloev (TJK)	0
Abdurahmanhaji Murtazaliev (KGZ)	0
Khalfan Balhol (UAE)	100
Mohammad Mansouri Davar (IRI)	0
Mohammad Al-Bilbaisi (JOR)	8

Semifinals
Saoud Al-Hammadi (UAE)	7
Haidar Al-Rasheed (JOR)	100
Khalfan Balhol (UAE)	6
Mohammad Al-Bilbaisi (JOR)	0

Gold medal
Haidar Al-Rasheed (JOR)	12
Khalfan Balhol (UAE)	0

Repechage
Sooknatee Suntra (THA)	6
Abdughafur Abdulloev (TJK)	3
Abdurahmanhaji Murtazaliev (KGZ)	100
Mohammad Mansouri Davar (IRI)	0

Bronze medals
Sooknatee Suntra (THA)	0
Mohammad Al-Bilbaisi (JOR)	13
Abdurahmanhaji Murtazaliev (KGZ)	0
Saoud Al-Hammadi (UAE)	2

==== 94 kg ====
25 September

Round of 16
Basel Fanous (JOR)	100
Gilbert Ombao (PHI)	0

Quarterfinals
Deepak Pandey (IND)	0
Natdanai Netthip (THA)	100
Muhammad Abid (PAK)	0
Faisal Al-Ketbi (UAE)	8
Döwran Myradow (TKM)	100
Aditya Deendas Sanil (IND)	0
Basel Fanous (JOR)	100
Baasandorjiin Ariuntsog (MGL)	0

Semifinals
Natdanai Netthip (THA)	0
Faisal Al-Ketbi (UAE)	9
Döwran Myradow (TKM)	0
Basel Fanous (JOR)	100

Gold medal
Faisal Al-Ketbi (UAE)	2
Basel Fanous (JOR)	0

Repechage
Deepak Pandey (IND)
Muhammad Abid (PAK)	WD
Aditya Deendas Sanil (IND)	0
Baasandorjiin Ariuntsog (MGL)	100

Bronze medals
Muhammad Abid (PAK)	100
Döwran Myradow (TKM)	0
Baasandorjiin Ariuntsog (MGL)	4
Natdanai Netthip (THA)	0

==== +94 kg ====
25 September

Round of 16
Yahya Al-Hammadi (UAE)	100
Võ Minh Trí (VIE)	0
Boldpüreviin Önörbat (MGL)	9
Zaid Granduke (JOR)	0
Muhammet Adaýew (TKM)	100
Lê Văn Đại (VIE)	0

Quarterfinals
Jitendra Khare (IND)	100
Dinesh Ambegoda (SRI)	0
Yahya Al-Hammadi (UAE)	100
Dheyaa Fadhil (IRQ)	0
Boldpüreviin Önörbat (MGL)	0
Alla Issa (IRQ)	100
Muhammet Adaýew (TKM)	0
Ahmed Butt (PAK)	100

Semifinals
Jitendra Khare (IND)	0
Yahya Al-Hammadi (UAE)	100
Alla Issa (IRQ)	0
Ahmed Butt (PAK)	3

Gold medal
Yahya Al-Hammadi (UAE)	4
Ahmed Butt (PAK)	0

Repechage
Dinesh Ambegoda (SRI)
Dheyaa Fadhil (IRQ)	WO
Boldpüreviin Önörbat (MGL)	100
Muhammet Adaýew (TKM)	0

Bronze medals
Dheyaa Fadhil (IRQ)	2
Alla Issa (IRQ)	2
Boldpüreviin Önörbat (MGL)	WD
Jitendra Khare (IND)

==== Openweight ====
27 September

Round of 16
Boldpüreviin Önörbat (MGL)	0
Basel Fanous (JOR)	100
Muhammad Abid (PAK)	9
Gian Dee (PHI)	0
Baasandorjiin Ariuntsog (MGL)	0
Ali Ahmed (IRQ)	0
Yahya Al-Hammadi (UAE)	3
Amir Hossein Khademian (IRI)	0

Quarterfinals
Basel Fanous (JOR)	WO
Ali Munfaredi (BRN)
Muhammad Abid (PAK)	0
Faisal Al-Ketbi (UAE)	16
Baasandorjiin Ariuntsog (MGL)	0
Haidar Al-Rasheed (JOR)	100
Yahya Al-Hammadi (UAE)	100
Jahanzeb Rashad Lone (PAK)	0

Semifinals
Basel Fanous (JOR)	0
Faisal Al-Ketbi (UAE)	2
Haidar Al-Rasheed (JOR)	7
Yahya Al-Hammadi (UAE)	100

Gold medal
Faisal Al-Ketbi (UAE)	0
Yahya Al-Hammadi (UAE)	14

=== Women's ne-waza ===
==== 45 kg ====
25 September

Quarterfinals		Semifinals		Gold medal
Maitha Al-Harasi (UAE)	0
Dinara Jumadurdyýewa (TKM)	100	Dinara Jumadurdyýewa (TKM)	0
Đỗ Thu Hà (VIE)	0	Meggie Ochoa (PHI)	100
Meggie Ochoa (PHI)	0			Meggie Ochoa (PHI)	100
Đào Lê Thu Trang (VIE)	2			Suwanan Boonsorn (THA)	4
Gülbahar Madreýmowa (TKM)	0	Đào Lê Thu Trang (VIE)	0
Wadima Al-Yafei (UAE)	0	Suwanan Boonsorn (THA)	14
Suwanan Boonsorn (THA)	100

Repechage
Maitha Al-Harasi (UAE)	0
Đỗ Thu Hà (VIE)	100
Gülbahar Madreýmowa (TKM)	2
Wadima Al-Yafei (UAE)	7

Bronze medals
Đỗ Thu Hà (VIE)	WO
Đào Lê Thu Trang (VIE)
Wadima Al-Yafei (UAE)	100
Dinara Jumadurdyýewa (TKM)	0

==== 49 kg ====
25 September

Round of 16
Maitha Sultan Shraim (UAE)	100
Hajir Mohammed (IRQ)	0
Caroline Pajaron (PHI)	2
Padcharaporn Posrikaew (THA)	4
Humaira Ashiq (PAK)	2
Rohini Kalam (IND)	0

Quarterfinals
Varaporn Poorisrisak (THA)	2
Dương Thị Thanh Minh (VIE)	0
Maitha Sultan Shraim (UAE)	0
Ulýana Kudinowa (TKM)	100
Padcharaporn Posrikaew (THA)	2
Tô Thị Trang (VIE)	18
Humaira Ashiq (PAK)	20
Mouza Al-Shamsi (UAE)	6

Semifinals
Varaporn Poorisrisak (THA)	100
Ulýana Kudinowa (TKM)	2
Tô Thị Trang (VIE)	10
Humaira Ashiq (PAK)	4

Gold medal
Varaporn Poorisrisak (THA)	100
Tô Thị Trang (VIE)	0

Repechage
Dương Thị Thanh Minh (VIE)	100
Maitha Sultan Shraim (UAE)	0
Padcharaporn Posrikaew (THA)	0
Mouza Al-Shamsi (UAE)	12

Bronze medals
Dương Thị Thanh Minh (VIE)	100
Humaira Ashiq (PAK)	0
Mouza Al-Shamsi (UAE)	0
Ulýana Kudinowa (TKM)	0

==== 55 kg ====
26 September

Round of 16
Alyazyah Al-Shehyari (UAE)	2
Ambreen Masih (PAK)	100
Kaila Napolis (PHI)	100
Maryam (PAK)	0

Quarterfinals
Annie Ramirez (PHI)	6
Angelina Filippowa (TKM)	0
Ambreen Masih (PAK)	0
Lea Farhat (LIB)	100
Nguyễn Thị Hồng Liên (VIE)	100
Pragya Joshi (IND)	0
Kaila Napolis (PHI)	0
Siramol Deepudsa (THA)	7

Semifinals
Annie Ramirez (PHI)	100
Lea Farhat (LIB)	0
Nguyễn Thị Hồng Liên (VIE)	0
Siramol Deepudsa (THA)	100

Gold medal
Annie Ramirez (PHI)	10
Siramol Deepudsa (THA)	0

Repechage
Angelina Filippowa (TKM)	100
Ambreen Masih (PAK)	3
Pragya Joshi (IND)	0
Kaila Napolis (PHI)	100

Bronze medals
Angelina Filippowa (TKM)	14
Nguyễn Thị Hồng Liên (VIE)	0
Kaila Napolis (PHI)	2
Lea Farhat (LIB)	2

==== 62 kg ====
26 September

Round of 16
Nguyễn Thị Thanh Thủy (VIE)	0
Apryl Eppinger (PHI)	100
Nguyễn Hoa Phượng (VIE)	0
Ruba Al-Sayegh (JOR)	100
Battsogtyn Buyandelger (MGL)	100
Akshata Subhash Khadtare (IND)	0
Asma Al-Suwaidi (UAE)	0
Orapa Senatham (THA)	100

Quarterfinals
Apryl Eppinger (PHI)	19
Roudha Yaqoob (UAE)	0
Ruba Al-Sayegh (JOR)	100
Shivani Gupta (IND)	0
Battsogtyn Buyandelger (MGL)	100
Kashaf Javed (PAK)	0
Orapa Senatham (THA)	100
Mähri Akmyradowa (TKM)	0

Semifinals
Apryl Eppinger (PHI)	0
Ruba Al-Sayegh (JOR)	100
Battsogtyn Buyandelger (MGL)	9
Orapa Senatham (THA)	4

Gold medal
Ruba Al-Sayegh (JOR)	0
Battsogtyn Buyandelger (MGL)	17

Repechage
Roudha Yaqoob (UAE)	WD
Shivani Gupta (IND)
Kashaf Javed (PAK)	100
Mähri Akmyradowa (TKM)	0

Bronze medals
Roudha Yaqoob (UAE)	0
Orapa Senatham (THA)	100
Kashaf Javed (PAK)	0
Apryl Eppinger (PHI)	16

==== 70 kg ====
26 September

Round of 16
Bhagyashree Bonde (IND)	0
Lou-Ann Jindani (PHI)	100
Gowher Atdaýewa (TKM)	0
Tsogt-Ochiryn Battsetseg (MGL)	23

Quarterfinals
Onanong Sangsirichok (THA)	0
Rana Qubbaj (JOR)	100
Lou-Ann Jindani (PHI)	2
Caren Chammas (LIB)	10
Salma Ali Al-Blooshi (UAE)	100
Rishal Sharma (IND)	0
Tsogt-Ochiryn Battsetseg (MGL)	100
Beenish Khan (PAK)	0

Semifinals
Rana Qubbaj (JOR)	100
Caren Chammas (LIB)	0
Salma Ali Al-Blooshi (UAE)	0
Tsogt-Ochiryn Battsetseg (MGL)	100

Gold medal
Rana Qubbaj (JOR)	6
Tsogt-Ochiryn Battsetseg (MGL)	0

Repechage
Onanong Sangsirichok (THA)	100
Lou-Ann Jindani (PHI)	0
Rishal Sharma (IND)	0
Beenish Khan (PAK)	100

Bronze medals
Onanong Sangsirichok (THA)	100
Salma Ali Al-Blooshi (UAE)	0
Beenish Khan (PAK)	100
Caren Chammas (LIB)	9

==== +70 kg ====
26 September

Quarterfinals
Đỗ Thị Hoài Uyên (VIE)	2
Myagmaryn Sugar (MGL)	18
Shamma Al-Marar (UAE)	DQ
Leýla Kuliýewa (TKM)

Semifinals
Myagmaryn Sugar (MGL)	0
Luma Qubbaj (JOR)	6
Shamma Al-Marar (UAE)	0
Đào Thị Thảo Nguyên (VIE)	100

Gold medal
Luma Qubbaj (JOR)	100
Đào Thị Thảo Nguyên (VIE)	0

Bronze medals
Đỗ Thị Hoài Uyên (VIE)	100
Shamma Al-Marar (UAE)	0
Bye
Myagmaryn Sugar (MGL)

==== Openweight ====
27 September

Round of 16
Đào Thị Thảo Nguyên (VIE)	0
Orapa Senatham (THA)	100
Kaila Napolis (PHI)	0
Luma Qubbaj (JOR)	100
Battsogtyn Buyandelger (MGL)	100
Đỗ Thị Hoài Uyên (VIE)	0

Quarterfinals
Orapa Senatham (THA)	0
Tsogt-Ochiryn Battsetseg (MGL)	100
Rana Qubbaj (JOR)	4
Annie Ramirez (PHI)	2
Luma Qubbaj (JOR)	100
Beenish Khan (PAK)	0
Onanong Sangsirichok (THA)	0
Battsogtyn Buyandelger (MGL)	100

Semifinals
Tsogt-Ochiryn Battsetseg (MGL)	100
Rana Qubbaj (JOR)	2
Luma Qubbaj (JOR)	100
Battsogtyn Buyandelger (MGL)	0

Gold medal
Tsogt-Ochiryn Battsetseg (MGL)	0
Luma Qubbaj (JOR)	100
