= Sailing at the 2022 Asian Games – Men's iQFoil =

Men's iQFoil at the 2022 Asian Games
- Venue: Xiangshan Sailing Centre
- Date: 21–27 September 2023
- Competitors: 9 from 9 nations

Medalists
gold medal	Bi Kun	China
silver medal	Lee Tae-hoon	South Korea
bronze medal	Cheng Ching Yin	Hong Kong

The men's iQFoil competition at the 2022 Asian Games was held from 21 to 27 September 2023 at Xiangshan Sailing Centre in Ningbo.

9 sailors competed in 18 opening series races. The boat finishing first advanced directly to the final, while the second and third-ranked advanced to the semifinal, while the rest moved to the quarterfinal.

== Schedule ==
All times are China Standard Time (UTC+08:00)

Date	Time	Event
Thursday, 21 September 2023	11:00	Race 1–4
Friday, 22 September 2023	14:00	Race 5–8
Saturday, 23 September 2023	11:04	Race 9–12
Sunday, 24 September 2023	14:04	Race 13–14
Tuesday, 26 September 2023	11:00	Race 15–18
Wednesday, 27 September 2023	11:00	Quarterfinal
Wednesday, 27 September 2023	11:00	Semifinal
Wednesday, 27 September 2023	11:00	Final

== Results ==
Legend

- BFD — Black flag disqualification
- DNC — Did not come to the starting area
- DNF — Did not finish
- DNS — Did not start
- RET — Retired

=== Opening series ===
Rank	Athlete	Race																		Total
Rank	Athlete	1	2	3	4	5	6	7	8	9	10	11	12	13	14	15	16	17	18	Total
1	Bi Kun (CHN)	~~(1)~~	~~(1)~~	1	1	1	1	1	1	1	1	1	1	1	1	1	1	1	~~(2)~~	15
2	Lee Tae-hoon (KOR)	3	3	2	2	3	2	~~(4)~~	2	2	3	~~(10)~~; BFD	2	2	2	~~(4)~~	2	2	4	36
3	Cheng Ching Yin (HKG)	2	2	3	3	2	3	3	3	~~(4)~~	2	~~(4)~~	3	~~(10)~~; DNF	3	3	4	3	1	40
4	Kensei Ikeda (JPN)	4	4	4	4	4	4	2	~~(5)~~	~~(6)~~	4	~~(10)~~; BFD	4	3	4	2	3	4	3	53
5	William McMillan (THA)	5	7	5	6	6	5	7	4	9	6	~~(10)~~; BFD	5	~~(10)~~; DNF	~~(10)~~; DNF	6	5	6	7	89
6	Elkan Oh (SGP)	6	6	7	5	5	6	6	6	8	7	~~(10)~~; BFD	6	~~(10)~~; DNF	~~(10)~~; DNF	5	7	5	5	90
7	Jerome Kumar (IND)	~~(8)~~	5	6	8	7	7	5	7	7	8	3	7	~~(10)~~; DNS	~~(10)~~; DNF	7	6	7	6	96
8	Abdulmajeed Al-Hadhrami (OMA)	7	8	8	7	8	8	8	8	3	5	2	~~(10)~~; RET	~~(10)~~; DNC	~~(10)~~; DNC	10; DNC	10; DNC	10; DNC	10; DNC	112
9	Keo Pheanon (CAM)	~~(10)~~; DNF	9	~~(10)~~; DNF	9	9	9	9	9	5	9	5	8	~~(10)~~; DNF	5	8	8	8	8	118

=== Medal series ===
Rank	Athlete	QF	SF	Final
1st place, gold medalist(s)	Bi Kun (CHN)	Bye	Bye	
2nd place, silver medalist(s)	Lee Tae-hoon (KOR)	Bye		
3rd place, bronze medalist(s)	Cheng Ching Yin (HKG)	Bye		
4	Kensei Ikeda (JPN)			
5	William McMillan (THA)			
6	Elkan Oh (SGP)			
7	Jerome Kumar (IND)			
8	Abdulmajeed Al-Hadhrami (OMA)			
9	Keo Pheanon (CAM)			

- No medal races were completed on 27 September as the wind conditions in the course area did not meet the requirement of racing. The medals were awarded based on the opening series ranking.
