= Chinese Taipei at the 2016 Asian Beach Games =

- IOC code: TPE
- NOC: Chinese Taipei Olympic Committee
- Website: www.tpenoc.net

in Danang, Vietnam September 24 – May 10
- Competitors: 53 in 4 sports
- Medals Ranked 18th: Gold 2 Silver 4 Bronze 10 Total 16

Asian Beach Games appearances
- 2008; 2010; 2012; 2014; 2016

Chinese Taipei competed in the 2016 Asian Beach Games in Danang, Vietnam from September 24 to October 5, 2016. The delegation was bannered by 53 athletes in 10 sports including 3x3 basketball, beach handball, beach kurash, beach volleyball, beach woodball, beach wrestling, ju-jitsu, muay thai, pétanque, and vovinam.

Lee Wan-ting, gold medallist in 2014, won the gold medal again in the women’s -57 kg division contest for beach kurash. Hsiao Chia-hung and Wang Wan-yi won the Men's Doubles Fairway for beach woodball. Chang Hui-tsz won the sivel medal in the women's +70 kg division for beach wrestling.

== Competitors ==
Sport	Men	Women	Total
3x3 basketball	0	4	4
Beach handball	0	10	10
Beach kurash	2	3	5
Beach volleyball	2	2	4
Beach woodball	8	8	16
Beach wrestling	0	2	2
Ju-jitsu	2	0	2
Muay Thai	1	3	4
Pétanque	4	0	4
Vovinam	1	1	2
Total	20	33	53

== Medal summary ==
=== Medal by Sport ===
Medals by sport
Sport	1st place, gold medalist(s)	2nd place, silver medalist(s)	3rd place, bronze medalist(s)	Total
3x3 basketball	0	0	1	1
Beach kurash	1	0	2	3
Beach woodball	1	3	2	6
Beach wrestling	0	1	0	1
Muay Thai	0	0	3	3
Pétanque	0	0	1	1
Vovinam	0	0	1	1
Total	2	4	10	16
