= Dhanani =

Dhanani is a surname. Notable people with the surname include:

- Abu Hurraira Dhanani, Pakistani jiu jitsu practitioner
- Katherine Dhanani, American diplomat
- Paresh Dhanani, Indian politician
- Shaheed Dhanani (born 1987), Tanzanian cricketer
