= Abu Hurraira Dhanani =

Pakistani martial arts player

Personal information
- Born: 26 September 1990 (age 36) Karachi, Pakistan
- Height: 5 ft 7 in (170 cm)
- Weight: 69 kg (152 lb)
- Website: Abuhurrara.com

Sport
- Country: Pakistan
- Sport: Ju-jitsu Judo
- Club: Karachi Martial Arts Academy
- Partner: Muhammad Ammar
- Coached by: Tariq Ali
Medal record
Representing Pakistan
World Championship
Silver medal – second place	2015 Ju-Jitsu World Championship Bangkok Thailand
Asian Beach Games 2014
Gold medal – first place	2014 Ju-jitsu	Duo System
Asian Ju-Jitsu Championship
Gold medal – first place	2010 Asian Ju-Jitsu & Belt wrestling Championship	Ju-jitsu fighting
Silver medal – second place	2010 Asian Ju-Jitsu & Belt wrestling Championship	Duo-system
Gold medal – first place	2012 Asian Ju-Jitsu & Belt wrestling Championship	Duo-system
Silver medal – second place	2012 Asian Ju-Jitsu & Belt wrestling Championship	Fighting
Silver medal – second place	2016 Asian Ju-Jitsu Championship at Ashgabat	Duo-system
Bronze medal – third place	2021 5th Asian Ju-Jitsu Championship 2021 at Abu dhabi	Duo-system
Bronze medal – third place	2021 5th Asian Ju-Jitsu Championship 2021 at Abu dhabi	Mix Duo-system
Asian Belt Wrestling Championship
Bronze medal – third place	Asian Ju-Jitsu & Belt wrestling Championship 2010	Belt wrestling fighting
Bronze medal – third place	4th Asian Jiu-Jitsu & Belt wrestling Championship 2012	Belt wrestling fighting
Asian Indoor Martial Arts Games 2017
Silver medal – second place	2017 Jujitsu	Duo system
World Games 2017
5th Position 2017 At Wroclaw Poland

Abu Hurraira Dhanani is an international jiu-jitsu athlete from Pakistan. Abu participated in the World Games, World Championship, Asian Beach Games, and Asian Indoor Martial Art Games, and won the Silver medal in the Ju-jitsu World Championship 2015.

Abu has won three Asian gold medals for Pakistan in the Asian Championship 2010, Asian Championship 2010, & Asian Beach Games 2014, respectively.

As of October 2022, Abu Hurraira Dhanani held four gold medals, six silver medals, and three Bronze medals in international events which is a result of an undying drive and evidence of his strength of character.

In September 2021, Abu won 2 bronze medals in the 5th Asian Championship .

Abu started playing Jiu-Jitsu, and earned his laurels, from Pakistan Jiu-Jitsu since 2004. Abu has remained unbeaten in jiu jitsu in Pakistan since 2010. He is also the only athlete who represented Pakistan in the World Games 2017.

Abu Hurraira Dhanani also gives free training in self-defense to orphans and females and spreads awareness of self-defense and harassment.
