= Sailing at the 2018 Asian Games – Men's RS:X =

Men's RS:X at the 2018 Asian Games
- Venue: Ancol Beach Marina
- Date: 24–31 August 2018
- Competitors: 10 from 10 nations

Medalists
gold medal	Bi Kun	China
silver medal	Michael Cheng	Hong Kong
bronze medal	Lee Tae-hoon	South Korea

The men's RS:X competition at the 2018 Asian Games was held from 24 to 31 August 2018.

== Schedule ==
All times are Western Indonesia Time (UTC+07:00)

Date	Time	Event
Friday, 24 August 2018	14:05	Race 1
Friday, 24 August 2018	14:50	Race 2
Saturday, 25 August 2018	12:05	Race 3
Saturday, 25 August 2018	13:10	Race 4
Saturday, 25 August 2018	14:20	Race 5
Sunday, 26 August 2018	12:05	Race 6
Sunday, 26 August 2018	13:15	Race 7
Sunday, 26 August 2018	14:05	Race 8
Tuesday, 28 August 2018	12:05	Race 9
Tuesday, 28 August 2018	12:55	Race 10
Tuesday, 28 August 2018	13:50	Race 11
Wednesday, 29 August 2018	12:35	Race 12
Wednesday, 29 August 2018	13:30	Race 13
Wednesday, 29 August 2018	14:30	Race 14
Friday, 31 August 2018	14:00	Race 15

== Results ==
Legend

- DNC — Did not come to the starting area
- OCS — On course side

Rank	Athlete	Race															Total
Rank	Athlete	1	2	3	4	5	6	7	8	9	10	11	12	13	14	15	Total
1st place, gold medalist(s)	Bi Kun (CHN)	1	1	~~(4)~~	1	2	1	1	1	1	1	1	2	1	4	1	19
2nd place, silver medalist(s)	Michael Cheng (HKG)	~~(4)~~	2	1	4	4	2	2	2	2	2	4	1	2	1	3	32
3rd place, bronze medalist(s)	Lee Tae-hoon (KOR)	3	3	2	2	1	~~(4)~~	3	3	3	3	2	4	3	2	2	36
4	Makoto Tomizawa (JPN)	2	4	3	3	3	3	4	4	5	4	3	3	7	5	~~(11)~~; DNC	53
5	Chang Hao (TPE)	5	6	6	6	5	6	5	5	4	6	~~(8)~~	6	6	3	5	74
6	Natthaphong Phonoppharat (THA)	6	5	5	5	~~(11)~~; OCS	5	6	6	6	5	5	5	4	8	4	75
7	Geylord Coveta (PHI)	8	8	7	~~(9)~~	7	7	7	7	7	8	6	7	5	7	8	99
8	Nyoman Suartana (INA)	9	9	8	8	8	8	8	9	~~(11)~~; OCS	7	7	8	8	6	6	109
9	Qasim Abbas (PAK)	7	7	9	7	6	9	9	8	8	9	9	9	~~(10)~~	9	7	113
10	Soth Mesa (CAM)	~~(10)~~	10	10	10	9	10	10	10	9	10	10	10	9	10	9	136
