= Beach woodball at the 2016 Asian Beach Games =

- Venue: Sơn Thủy Beach
- Dates: 25 September – 2 October 2016

Beach woodball competition at the 2016 Asian Beach Games was held in Da Nang, Vietnam from 25 September to 2 October 2016 at Son Thuy Beach, Da Nang, Vietnam.

== Medalists ==
=== Stroke ===
| Event | Gold | Silver | Bronze |
|---|---|---|---|
| Men's singles | Ahris Sumariyanto; Indonesia | Jetsada Cheenkurd; Thailand | Kim Pyo-hwan; South Korea |
| Men's team | Thailand; Nutchanon Kongpolprom; Nakorn Nualraksa; Phetanun Pronsane; Kiadtisak Saengrit; Thawatchai Sirisilanan; Weerasak Srisamoot | Chinese Taipei; Hong Shih-jie; Hsia Chih-hsuan; Hsiao Chia-hung; Lo Chieh; Tsai Cheng-yu; Wu Yi-cheng | Indonesia; Putu Budhiyasa; Khoirul Mustakhim; Gede Riska Sanjaya; Ahris Sumariyanto; Marga Nugraha Susilo; Wisnu Wicaksono |
| Women's singles | Phùng Thị Thương; Vietnam | Chiang Fang-yu; Chinese Taipei | Ika Yulianingsih; Indonesia |
| Women's team | Thailand; Palida Kangkeeree; Siriwan Kangkeeree; Klissana Khaodee; Siripanadda Kuemram; Thanchanok Sareepan; Autchara Thongnim | Chinese Taipei; Cai Yi-ting; Chang Wan-ling; Chen Chia-lin; Chiang Fang-yu; Hong Yu-mei; Wang Mei-lin | Vietnam; Nguyễn Huyền Trang; Nguyễn Thị Phương; Phan Thị Phượng; Phùng Thị Kết; Phùng Thị Thương |

=== Fairway ===
| Event | Gold | Silver | Bronze |
|---|---|---|---|
| Men's singles | Phetanun Pronsane; Thailand | Nutchanon Kongpolprom; Thailand | Ye Qiwei; China |
| Men's singles | Phetanun Pronsane; Thailand | Nutchanon Kongpolprom; Thailand | Vũ Hồng Quân; Vietnam |
| Men's doubles | Chinese Taipei; Hsiao Chia-hung; Wang Wan-yi | Thailand; Worachet Janthasan; Wittaya Songmueang | China; Zhang Xinsheng; Wang Weidian |
| Men's doubles | Chinese Taipei; Hsiao Chia-hung; Wang Wan-yi | Thailand; Worachet Janthasan; Wittaya Songmueang | China; Chen Liang; Si Qinru |
| Men's team | Thailand; Nutchanon Kongpolprom; Nakorn Nualraksa; Phetanun Pronsane; Kiadtisak Saengrit | China; Miao Yanzhao; Wang Weidian; Ye Qiwei; Zhang Xinsheng | Vietnam; Cao Hoàng Anh; Nguyễn Văn Nam; Trần Duy Anh; Vũ Hồng Quân |
| Men's team | Thailand; Nutchanon Kongpolprom; Nakorn Nualraksa; Phetanun Pronsane; Kiadtisak Saengrit | China; Miao Yanzhao; Wang Weidian; Ye Qiwei; Zhang Xinsheng | Chinese Taipei; Hong Shih-jie; Hsiao Chia-hung; Lo Chieh; Tsai Cheng-yu |
| Women's singles | Phan Thị Phượng; Vietnam | Nguyễn Huyền Trang; Vietnam | Dwi Tiga Putri; Indonesia |
| Women's singles | Phan Thị Phượng; Vietnam | Nguyễn Huyền Trang; Vietnam | Ni Putu Devianasari; Indonesia |
| Women's doubles | Thailand; Ratchanee Na Nakhon; Rapeephon Rakteepueng | Thailand; Amorntip Kangkeeree; Anatthaon Tiangaun | China; Zhu Xiaojing; Wang Ping |
| Women's doubles | Thailand; Ratchanee Na Nakhon; Rapeephon Rakteepueng | Thailand; Amorntip Kangkeeree; Anatthaon Tiangaun | Malaysia; Zainal Akmal Awang; Widilestari Setianingsih |
| Women's team | Vietnam; Nguyễn Huyền Trang; Nguyễn Thị Phương; Phan Thị Phượng; Phùng Thị Thương | China; Li Yifeng; Wang Ping; Zhou Wanying; Zhu Xiaojing | Chinese Taipei; Cai Yi-ting; Chen Chia-lin; Hsieh Ping-yen; Ke Pei-yu |
| Women's team | Vietnam; Nguyễn Huyền Trang; Nguyễn Thị Phương; Phan Thị Phượng; Phùng Thị Thương | China; Li Yifeng; Wang Ping; Zhou Wanying; Zhu Xiaojing | Thailand; Klissana Khaodee; Siripanadda Kuemram; Thanchanok Sareepan; Autchara Thongnim |
| Mixed doubles | Thailand; Nutchanon Kongpolprom; Klissana Khaodee | Thailand; Kiadtisak Saengrit; Siripanadda Kuemram | China; Miao Yanzhao; Zhou Wanying |
| Mixed doubles | Thailand; Nutchanon Kongpolprom; Klissana Khaodee | Thailand; Kiadtisak Saengrit; Siripanadda Kuemram | Hong Kong; Ko Yun Tao; Tsoi Lee Lee |

== Medal table ==
| Rank | Nation | Gold | Silver | Bronze | Total |
|---|---|---|---|---|---|
| 1 | Thailand (THA) | 6 | 5 | 1 | 12 |
| 2 | Vietnam (VIE) | 3 | 1 | 3 | 7 |
| 3 | Chinese Taipei (TPE) | 1 | 3 | 2 | 6 |
| 4 | Indonesia (INA) | 1 | 0 | 4 | 5 |
| 5 | China (CHN) | 0 | 2 | 5 | 7 |
| 6 | Hong Kong (HKG) | 0 | 0 | 1 | 1 |
| 6 | Malaysia (MAS) | 0 | 0 | 1 | 1 |
| 6 | South Korea (KOR) | 0 | 0 | 1 | 1 |
| Totals (8 entries) | | 11 | 11 | 18 | 40 |

== Results ==
=== Stroke ===
==== Men's singles ====
30 September – 2 October

| Rank | Athlete | Prel. | Final |
|---|---|---|---|
| 1st place, gold medalist(s) | Ahris Sumariyanto (INA) | 94 | 138 |
| 2nd place, silver medalist(s) | Jetsada Cheenkurd (THA) | 90 | 139 |
| 3rd place, bronze medalist(s) | Kim Pyo-hwan (KOR) | 104 | 150 |
| 4 | Suriya Boonrod (THA) | 102 | 151 |
| 5 | Wisnu Wicaksono (INA) | 109 | 157 |
| 6 | Kim Myoung-ki (KOR) | 106 | 161 |
| 7 | Aminodin Othman (MAS) | 103 | 162 |
| 8 | Abdullah Ahmad (MAS) | 104 | 163 |
| 9 | Bharat Gurav (IND) | 116 | 173 |
| 10 | Suraj Singh Yeotikar (IND) | 155 | |

==== Men's team ====
30 September – 1 October

| Rank | Team | Score |
|---|---|---|
| 1st place, gold medalist(s) | Thailand (THA) | 354 |
| 2nd place, silver medalist(s) | Chinese Taipei (TPE) | 362 |
| 3rd place, bronze medalist(s) | Indonesia (INA) | 375 |
| 4 | China (CHN) | 379 |
| 5 | Hong Kong (HKG) | 388 |
| 6 | Malaysia (MAS) | 399 |
| 7 | Vietnam (VIE) | 403 |
| 8 | South Korea (KOR) | 453 |
| 9 | India (IND) | 557 |

==== Women's singles ====
30 September – 2 October

| Rank | Athlete | Prel. | Final |
|---|---|---|---|
| 1st place, gold medalist(s) | Phùng Thị Thương (VIE) | 106 | 147 |
| 2nd place, silver medalist(s) | Chiang Fang-yu (TPE) | 98 | 147 |
| 3rd place, bronze medalist(s) | Ika Yulianingsih (INA) | 96 | 149 |
| 4 | Hong Yu-mei (TPE) | 106 | 152 |
| 5 | Nguyễn Thị Phương (VIE) | 106 | 161 |
| 6 | Jeong Hyang-sook (KOR) | 116 | 170 |
| 7 | Lee Sang-wook (KOR) | 121 | 171 |
| 8 | Elva Selfiana Lumbanraja (INA) | 113 | 173 |
| 9 | Suraini Abdul Hamid (MAS) | 127 | 182 |
| 10 | Pooja Sahu (IND) | 134 | |
| 11 | Chan Moi Nan (MAS) | 154 | |
| 12 | Pooja Chaudhary (IND) | 161 | |

==== Women's team ====
30 September – 1 October

| Rank | Team | Score |
|---|---|---|
| 1st place, gold medalist(s) | Thailand (THA) | 367 |
| 2nd place, silver medalist(s) | Chinese Taipei (TPE) | 384 |
| 3rd place, bronze medalist(s) | Vietnam (VIE) | 404 |
| 4 | Hong Kong (HKG) | 409 |
| 5 | China (CHN) | 418 |
| 6 | Indonesia (INA) | 429 |
| 7 | Malaysia (MAS) | 452 |
| 8 | South Korea (KOR) | 481 |
| 9 | India (IND) | 641 |

=== Fairway ===
==== Men's singles ====
25 September

Preliminary round 1
Ye Qiwei (CHN) | 3
Prem Prakash Meena (IND) | 2
Nutchanon Kongpolprom (THA) | 2
Jeremy Ngai (HKG) | 0
Vikas Eknath Ingle (IND) | 1
Miao Yanzhao (CHN) | 4
Chan Wah Fung (HKG) | 1
Vũ Hồng Quân (VIE) | 3

Preliminary round 2
Marga Nugraha Susilo (INA) | 0
Ye Qiwei (CHN) | 3
Nutchanon Kongpolprom (THA) | 3
Nguyễn Văn Nam (VIE) | 2
Phetanun Pronsane (THA) | 3
Miao Yanzhao (CHN) | 2
Vũ Hồng Quân (VIE) | 3
Ahris Sumariyanto (INA) | 0

Preliminary round 3
Ye Qiwei (CHN) | 2
Nutchanon Kongpolprom (THA) | 3
Phetanun Pronsane (THA) | 2
Vũ Hồng Quân (VIE) | 1

Final
Nutchanon Kongpolprom (THA) | 1
Phetanun Pronsane (THA) | 3

==== Men's doubles ====
26 September

Preliminary round 1
Kim Jin-won (KOR); Jung Jae-sung (KOR) | 1
Zhang Xinsheng (CHN); Wang Weidian (CHN) | 3
Phetanun Pronsane (THA); Nakorn Nualraksa (THA) | 3
Abdullah Ahmad (MAS); Hamkar Abdul Ghaffar (MAS) | 1
Har Cheuk Kin (HKG); Leung Hong Yee (HKG) | 0
Kim Pyo-hwan (KOR); Im Kyung-muk (KOR) | 3
Syed Bakar Osman (MAS); Arifin Mamat (MAS) | 1
Li Cheng-wei (TPE); Lo Chieh (TPE) | 3

Preliminary round 2
Li Chi Tak (HKG); Lam Chi Ho (HKG) | 1
Zhang Xinsheng (CHN); Wang Weidian (CHN) | 3
Phetanun Pronsane (THA); Nakorn Nualraksa (THA) | 1
Hsiao Chia-hung (TPE); Wang Wan-yi (TPE) | 3
Chen Liang (CHN); Si Qinru (CHN) | 3
Kim Pyo-hwan (KOR); Im Kyung-muk (KOR) | 0
Li Cheng-wei (TPE); Lo Chieh (TPE) | 1
Worachet Janthasan (THA); Wittaya Songmueang (THA) | 2

Preliminary round 3
Zhang Xinsheng (CHN); Wang Weidian (CHN) | 0
Hsiao Chia-hung (TPE); Wang Wan-yi (TPE) | 3
Chen Liang (CHN); Si Qinru (CHN) | 2
Worachet Janthasan (THA); Wittaya Songmueang (THA) | 3

Final
Hsiao Chia-hung (TPE); Wang Wan-yi (TPE) | 2
Worachet Janthasan (THA); Wittaya Songmueang (THA) | 0

==== Men's team ====
29 September

Preliminary round 1
Malaysia | 2
Hong Kong | 1

Preliminary round 2
Thailand | 2
Malaysia | 1
India | 0
Vietnam | 3
China | 2
Indonesia | 1
South Korea | 0
Chinese Taipei | 2

Preliminary round 3
Thailand | 2
Vietnam | 1
China | 2
Chinese Taipei | 1

Final
Thailand | 3
China | 0

==== Women's singles ====
25 September

Preliminary round 1
Zhou Wanying (CHN) | 3
Cai Yi-ting (TPE) | 2
Li Yifeng (CHN) | 3
Hsieh Ping-yen (TPE) | 2

Preliminary round 2
Dwi Tiga Putri (INA) | 3
Zhou Wanying (CHN) | 1
Tsoi Lee Lee (HKG) | 0
Phan Thị Phượng (VIE) | 3
Wong Nga Chun (HKG) | 1
Ni Putu Devianasari (INA) | 3
Li Yifeng (CHN) | 3
Nguyễn Huyền Trang (VIE) | 4

Preliminary round 3
Dwi Tiga Putri (INA) | 2
Phan Thị Phượng (VIE) | 3
Ni Putu Devianasari (INA) | 0
Nguyễn Huyền Trang (VIE) | 3

Final
Phan Thị Phượng (VIE) | 3
Nguyễn Huyền Trang (VIE) | 0

==== Women's doubles ====
26 September

Preliminary round 1
Zhu Xiaojing (CHN); Wang Ping (CHN) | 3
Nguyễn Thị Phương (VIE); Phùng Thị Thương (VIE) | 0
Chan Tsz Ying (HKG); Ko Wing Yan (HKG) | 1
Chen Chia-lin (TPE); Chang Wan-ling (TPE) | 3
Amorntip Kangkeeree (THA); Anatthaon Tiangaun (THA) | 3
Loo Lee Lee (MAS); Rohani Atan (MAS) | 0
Zainal Akmal Awang (MAS); Widilestari Setianingsih (MAS) | 4
Kalva Radha Rao (IND); Archana Mahajan (IND) | 0
Xi Shanna (CHN); Shen Huifen (CHN) | 3
Chang Ae-ran (KOR); Ha Bong-soon (KOR) | 2
Chung Chui Ting (HKG); Hung Po Ka (HKG) | 1
Ke Pei-yu (TPE); Hsieh Ping-yen (TPE) | 0

Preliminary round 2
Kim Mi-ran (KOR); Koo Myung-suk (KOR) | 0
Zhu Xiaojing (CHN); Wang Ping (CHN) | 3
Chen Chia-lin (TPE); Chang Wan-ling (TPE) | 1
Amorntip Kangkeeree (THA); Anatthaon Tiangaun (THA) | 2
Zainal Akmal Awang (MAS); Widilestari Setianingsih (MAS) | 3
Xi Shanna (CHN); Shen Huifen (CHN) | 1
Chung Chui Ting (HKG); Hung Po Ka (HKG) | 2
Ratchanee Na Nakhon (THA); Rapeephon Rakteepueng (THA) | 3

Preliminary round 3
Zhu Xiaojing (CHN); Wang Ping (CHN) | 3
Amorntip Kangkeeree (THA); Anatthaon Tiangaun (THA) | 4
Zainal Akmal Awang (MAS); Widilestari Setianingsih (MAS) | 0
Ratchanee Na Nakhon (THA); Rapeephon Rakteepueng (THA) | 3

Final
Amorntip Kangkeeree (THA); Anatthaon Tiangaun (THA) | 2
Ratchanee Na Nakhon (THA); Rapeephon Rakteepueng (THA) | 3

==== Women's team ====
28 September

Preliminary round 1
South Korea | 0
Hong Kong | 3

Preliminary round 2
Vietnam | 2
Hong Kong | 1
Indonesia | 1
Chinese Taipei | 2
China | 3
Malaysia | 0
India | 0
Thailand | 3

Preliminary round 3
Vietnam | 2
Chinese Taipei | 1
China | 2
Thailand | 1

Final
Vietnam | 2
China | 1

==== Mixed doubles ====
27 September

Preliminary round 1
| Kapil Kumar Sahu (IND); Pooja Chaudhary (IND) | 2–4 | Hong Shih-jie (TPE); Wang Mei-lin (TPE) |

Preliminary round 2
Ahris Sumariyanto (INA); Ika Yulianingsih (INA) | 2
Hong Shih-jie (TPE); Wang Mei-lin (TPE) | 3
Kiadtisak Saengrit (THA); Siripanadda Kuemram (THA) | 2
Vũ Hồng Quân (VIE); Phan Thị Phượng (VIE) | 0
Miao Yanzhao (CHN); Zhou Wanying (CHN) | 3
Kim Myoung-ki (KOR); Lee Sang-wook (KOR) | 0
Azmi Ahmad (MAS); Aniah Hassan (MAS) | 4
Jeremy Ngai (HKG); Wong Nga Chun (HKG) | 1
Ye Qiwei (CHN); Li Yifeng (CHN) | 1
Ko Yun Tao (HKG); Tsoi Lee Lee (HKG) | 2
Aminodin Othman (MAS); Lien Yen Wa (MAS) | 1
Cha Duck-bea (KOR); Jeong Hyang-sook (KOR) | 3
Nutchanon Kongpolprom (THA); Klissana Khaodee (THA) | 3
Wu Yi-cheng (TPE); Cai Yi-ting (TPE) | 2
Bharath Gundappa (IND); Sushmitha Jagadeesh (IND) | 0
Nguyễn Văn Nam (VIE); Nguyễn Huyền Trang (VIE) | 3

Preliminary round 3
Hong Shih-jie (TPE); Wang Mei-lin (TPE) | 1
Kiadtisak Saengrit (THA); Siripanadda Kuemram (THA) | 2
Miao Yanzhao (CHN); Zhou Wanying (CHN) | 3
Azmi Ahmad (MAS); Aniah Hassan (MAS) | 2
Ko Yun Tao (HKG); Tsoi Lee Lee (HKG) | 3
Cha Duck-bea (KOR); Jeong Hyang-sook (KOR) | 1
Nutchanon Kongpolprom (THA); Klissana Khaodee (THA) | 3
Nguyễn Văn Nam (VIE); Nguyễn Huyền Trang (VIE) | 0

Preliminary round 4
Kiadtisak Saengrit (THA); Siripanadda Kuemram (THA) | 3
Miao Yanzhao (CHN); Zhou Wanying (CHN) | 1
Ko Yun Tao (HKG); Tsoi Lee Lee (HKG) | 0
Nutchanon Kongpolprom (THA); Klissana Khaodee (THA) | 3

Final
Kiadtisak Saengrit (THA); Siripanadda Kuemram (THA) | 1
Nutchanon Kongpolprom (THA); Klissana Khaodee (THA) | 3
