= Open water swimming at the 2016 Asian Beach Games =

Open water swimming competition at the 2016 Asian Beach Games

- Venue: Biển Đông Park
- Dates: 23–25 September 2016

Open water swimming competition at the 2016 Asian Beach Games was held in Danang, Vietnam on 23 and 25 September 2016 at the Bien Dong Park, Danang.

== Medalists ==
=== Men ===
Event	Gold	Silver	Bronze
5 km	Vitaliy Khudyakov; Kazakhstan	Saleh Mohammad; Syria	Trần Tấn Triệu; Vietnam
10 km	Vitaliy Khudyakov; Kazakhstan	Wang Wenhao; China	Saleh Mohammad; Syria

=== Women ===
Event	Gold	Silver	Bronze
5 km	Benjaporn Sriphanomthorn; Thailand	Lei Shan; China	Li Yilin; China
10 km	Xin Xin; China	Yang Dandan; China	Xeniya Romanchuk; Kazakhstan

== Medal table ==
Rank	Nation	Gold	Silver	Bronze	Total
1	Kazakhstan (KAZ)	2	0	1	3
2	China (CHN)	1	3	1	5
3	Thailand (THA)	1	0	0	1
4	Syria (SYR)	0	1	1	2
5	Vietnam (VIE)	0	0	1	1
Totals (5 entries)		4	4	4	12

== Results ==
=== Men ===
==== 5 km ====
25 September

Rank	Athlete	Time
1st place, gold medalist(s)	Vitaliy Khudyakov (KAZ)	58:03.3
2nd place, silver medalist(s)	Saleh Mohammad (SYR)	58:10.6
3rd place, bronze medalist(s)	Trần Tấn Triệu (VIE)	58:54.1
4	Zhang Zibin (CHN)	59:06.0
5	Han Lidu (CHN)	1:00:18.0
6	Kenessary Kenenbayev (KAZ)	1:01:13.7
7	Lâm Quang Nhật (VIE)	1:02:34.8
8	Singha Chau (HKG)	1:02:36.5
9	Kalint Supviwattanakul (THA)	1:04:51.4
10	Axel Ngui (PHI)	1:05:14.0
11	Abdelrahman Hesham Mohamed (QAT)	1:05:32.4
12	Abdulla Aboughazala (QAT)	1:06:10.5
13	Winson Lee (HKG)	1:06:43.6
14	Jiarapong Sangkhawat (THA)	1:08:04.0
—	Tharindu Udayanga (SRI)	OTL
—	Eshan Welappu (SRI)	OTL

==== 10 km ====
23 September

Rank	Athlete	Time
1st place, gold medalist(s)	Vitaliy Khudyakov (KAZ)	2:02:07.2
2nd place, silver medalist(s)	Wang Wenhao (CHN)	2:04:55.9
3rd place, bronze medalist(s)	Saleh Mohammad (SYR)	2:06:20.4
4	Nguyễn Huy Hoàng (VIE)	2:06:29.0
5	Tanakrit Kittiya (THA)	2:10:37.1
6	Keith Sin (HKG)	2:12:18.2
7	Weng Jingwei (CHN)	2:15:46.2
8	Thanath Jesdakham (THA)	2:17:28.3
9	Kwan Ho Yin (HKG)	2:17:48.6
10	Kenessary Kenenbayev (KAZ)	2:24:56.0
11	Jessie Lacuna (PHI)	2:26:53.6
—	Lâm Quang Nhật (VIE)	DNF
—	Sridhar Aswathaaman (IND)	DSQ

=== Women ===
==== 5 km ====
23 September

Rank	Athlete	Time
1st place, gold medalist(s)	Benjaporn Sriphanomthorn (THA)	1:05:57.6
2nd place, silver medalist(s)	Lei Shan (CHN)	1:05:59.2
3rd place, bronze medalist(s)	Li Yilin (CHN)	1:06:01.9
4	Natthanan Junkrajang (THA)	1:06:17.8
5	Xeniya Romanchuk (KAZ)	1:06:18.7
6	Trần Thị Hồng Cẩm (VIE)	1:07:13.3
7	Lê Thị Mỹ Thảo (VIE)	1:07:39.4
8	Fiona Chan (HKG)	1:07:42.9
9	Claudia Wong (HKG)	1:14:54.9
10	Maria Claire Adorna (PHI)	1:15:05.2
11	Courtney Gray (PHI)	1:17:44.6
—	Sunethra Wijeratne (SRI)	OTL
—	Sashini Navodya (SRI)	OTL

==== 10 km ====
25 September

Rank	Athlete	Time
1st place, gold medalist(s)	Xin Xin (CHN)	2:14:01.6
2nd place, silver medalist(s)	Yang Dandan (CHN)	2:14:14.8
3rd place, bronze medalist(s)	Xeniya Romanchuk (KAZ)	2:14:20.0
4	Lê Thị Mỹ Thảo (VIE)	2:19:48.8
5	Tiffany Lee (HKG)	2:19:52.4
6	Ammiga Himathongkom (THA)	2:26:21.1
7	Lok Hoi Man (HKG)	2:34:39.0
8	Courtney Gray (PHI)	2:38:41.8
9	S. V. Nikitha (IND)	2:41:36.3
—	Benjaporn Sriphanomthorn (THA)	DNF
—	Mai Thị Linh (VIE)	DNF
—	Maria Claire Adorna (PHI)	DNS
