= Shuttlecock at the 2016 Asian Beach Games =

- Venue: Phương Trang Area
- Dates: 26–30 September 2016

Beach shuttlecock competition at the 2016 Asian Beach Games was held in Danang, Vietnam from 26 to 30 September 2016 at Phuong Trang Area, Danang, Vietnam.

== Medalists ==
Event	Gold	Silver	Bronze
Men's singles	Đinh Văn Đức; Vietnam	Praphan Mainoi; Thailand	Chan Ho Yin; Hong Kong
Men's singles	Đinh Văn Đức; Vietnam	Praphan Mainoi; Thailand	Mai Yutian; China
Men's doubles	Vietnam; Lê Thanh Tuấn; Nguyễn Anh Tuấn	China; Mai Yutian; Gao Haoguang	Macau; Ho Man Chon; Tam Chi Kin
Men's doubles	Vietnam; Lê Thanh Tuấn; Nguyễn Anh Tuấn	China; Mai Yutian; Gao Haoguang	Thailand; Komkrissada Chumkhotr; Sorrasak Thaosiri
Men's team	Vietnam; Đinh Văn Đức; Lạc Chí Đức; Lê Thanh Tuấn; Nguyễn Anh Tuấn; Nguyễn Thế Thắng; Trần Thanh Điền	China; Gao Haoguang; Lu Wenliang; Luo Pan; Ma Weilun; Mai Yutian; Yang Zetao	Hong Kong; Chan Ho Yin; Anthony Cheung; Hon Sze Ming; Lau Ho Kan; Leung Kwan Ho; Kevin Or
Men's team	Vietnam; Đinh Văn Đức; Lạc Chí Đức; Lê Thanh Tuấn; Nguyễn Anh Tuấn; Nguyễn Thế Thắng; Trần Thanh Điền	China; Gao Haoguang; Lu Wenliang; Luo Pan; Ma Weilun; Mai Yutian; Yang Zetao	Thailand; Komkrissada Chumkhotr; Panapong Khajornfung; Praphan Mainoi; Khomkrit Poksanthia; Wichan Temkort; Sorrasak Thaosiri
Women's singles	Nguyễn Thị Ánh Nguyệt; Vietnam	Lin Xiuting; China	Wong Weng Man; Macau
Women's singles	Nguyễn Thị Ánh Nguyệt; Vietnam	Lin Xiuting; China	Sasiwimol Janthasit; Thailand
Women's doubles	Vietnam; Nguyễn Thị Đào; Hoàng Thị Trà My	China; Lin Xiuting; Liang Yingying	Macau; Lam Ka Man; Leong On Kei
Women's doubles	Vietnam; Nguyễn Thị Đào; Hoàng Thị Trà My	China; Lin Xiuting; Liang Yingying	Thailand; Sasiwimol Janthasit; Masaya Duangsri
Women's team	Vietnam; Hoàng Thị Minh Thuận; Hoàng Thị Trà My; Lê Thị Lan Hương; Nguyễn Thị Ánh Nguyệt; Nguyễn Thị Đào; Nguyễn Thị Thủy Tiên	Thailand; Masaya Duangsri; Wanwisa Jankaen; Sasiwimol Janthasit; Fueangfa Praphatsarang; Kaewjai Pumsawangkaew; Payom Srihongsa	Macau; Lam Ka Man; Leong On Kei; Wong Wai Seong; Wong Weng Man
Women's team	Vietnam; Hoàng Thị Minh Thuận; Hoàng Thị Trà My; Lê Thị Lan Hương; Nguyễn Thị Ánh Nguyệt; Nguyễn Thị Đào; Nguyễn Thị Thủy Tiên	Thailand; Masaya Duangsri; Wanwisa Jankaen; Sasiwimol Janthasit; Fueangfa Praphatsarang; Kaewjai Pumsawangkaew; Payom Srihongsa	China; Cai Jinyu; Li Siwen; Liang Yingying; Lin Xiuting; Zhuang Qianqian
Mixed doubles	Vietnam; Trần Thanh Điền; Nguyễn Thị Thủy Tiên	Thailand; Sorrasak Thaosiri; Masaya Duangsri	Macau; Tam Chi Kin; Leong On Kei
Mixed doubles	Vietnam; Trần Thanh Điền; Nguyễn Thị Thủy Tiên	Thailand; Sorrasak Thaosiri; Masaya Duangsri	China; Mai Yutian; Li Siwen

== Medal table ==
Rank	Nation	Gold	Silver	Bronze	Total
1	Vietnam (VIE)	7	0	0	7
2	China (CHN)	0	4	3	7
3	Thailand (THA)	0	3	4	7
4	Macau (MAC)	0	0	5	5
5	Hong Kong (HKG)	0	0	2	2
Totals (5 entries)		7	7	14	28

== Results ==
=== Men's singles ===
==== Preliminary ====
27–28 September

Pos	Athlete	Pld	W	L	Pts	VIE	THA	CHN	HKG	IND	MAC
1	Đinh Văn Đức (VIE)	5	5	0	10	—	2–0	2–0	2–0	2–0	WO
2	Praphan Mainoi (THA)	5	4	1	9	12, 14	—	2–0	2–0	2–0	WO
3	Mai Yutian (CHN)	5	3	2	8	7, 16	12, 16	—	2–0	2–0	2–0
4	Chan Ho Yin (HKG)	5	2	3	7	5, 6	13, 1	14, 11	—	2–0	2–0
5	Murugan Kajendran (IND)	5	0	5	5	1, 2	9, 6	9, 5	9, 10	—	0–2
6	Ho Man Chon (MAC)	5	1	4	4			9, 7	5, 17	−5, −9	—

Source: OCA

==== Knockout round ====
28 September

Semifinals				Gold medal match
Đinh Văn Đức (VIE)	21	21
Chan Ho Yin (HKG)	7	6		Đinh Văn Đức (VIE)	21	21
Mai Yutian (CHN)	15	21	14	Praphan Mainoi (THA)	13	16
Praphan Mainoi (THA)	21	18	21

=== Men's doubles ===
==== Preliminary ====
26 September

Pos	Team	Pld	W	L	Pts	VIE	CHN	THA	MAC	HKG	IND
1	Lê Thanh Tuấn (VIE) Nguyễn Anh Tuấn (VIE)	5	5	0	10	—	2–0	2–0	2–0	2–0	2–0
2	Mai Yutian (CHN) Gao Haoguang (CHN)	5	4	1	9	10, 13	—	2–0	2–0	2–0	2–0
3	Komkrissada Chumkhotr (THA) Sorrasak Thaosiri (THA)	5	3	2	8	17, 15	18, 17	—	2–0	2–0	2–0
4	Ho Man Chon (MAC) Tam Chi Kin (MAC)	5	2	3	7	5, 11	14, 11	16, 21	—	2–0	2–0
5	Hon Sze Ming (HKG) Lau Ho Kan (HKG)	5	1	4	6	8, 7	17, 17	12, 6	18, 14	—	2–0
6	Murugan Kajendran (IND) Muthu Krishnan Sethuraj (IND)	5	0	5	5	3, 7	6, 8	2, 2	3, 6	3, 2	—

Source: OCA

==== Knockout round ====
Semifinals; 26 September				Gold medal match 27 September
Lê Thanh Tuấn (VIE); Nguyễn Anh Tuấn (VIE)	21	21
Ho Man Chon (MAC); Tam Chi Kin (MAC)	8	12		Lê Thanh Tuấn (VIE); Nguyễn Anh Tuấn (VIE)	21	21
Komkrissada Chumkhotr (THA); Sorrasak Thaosiri (THA)	22	22	16	Mai Yutian (CHN); Gao Haoguang (CHN)	10	13
Mai Yutian (CHN); Gao Haoguang (CHN)	24	20	21

=== Men's team ===
==== Preliminary ====
28–29 September

Pos	Team	Pld	W	L	Pts	VIE	CHN	THA	HKG	MAC	IND
1	Vietnam	5	5	0	10	—	2–0	2–0	2–0	2–0	2–0
2	China	5	4	1	8	16, 16	—	2–1	2–0	2–0	2–0
3	Thailand	5	3	2	6	16, 6	18, −17, 18	—	2–0	2–0	2–0
4	Hong Kong	5	2	3	4	9, 16	8, 9	14, 21	—	2–0	2–0
5	Macau	5	1	4	2	7, 12	16, 10	12, 10	13, 13	—	2–0
6	India	5	0	5	0	4, 2	5, 3	2, 7	9, 10	1, 14	—

Source: OCA

==== Knockout round ====
30 September

Semifinals				Gold medal match
Vietnam	21	21
Hong Kong	10	10		Vietnam	21	21
Thailand	16	21	14	China	8	13
China	21	18	21

=== Women's singles ===
==== Preliminary ====
27–28 September

Pos	Athlete	Pld	W	L	Pts	VIE	CHN	THA	MAC	HKG	IND
1	Nguyễn Thị Ánh Nguyệt (VIE)	5	5	0	10	—	2–0	2–0	2–0	2–0	WO
2	Lin Xiuting (CHN)	5	4	1	9	9, 12	—	2–1	2–0	WO	WO
3	Sasiwimol Janthasit (THA)	5	3	2	8	4, 8	16, −21, 16	—	2–0	2–0	WO
4	Wong Weng Man (MAC)	5	2	3	7	4, 4	17, 12	4, 16	—	WO	WO
5	Lo Wai Ming (HKG)	5	1	4	4	7, 6		16, 7		—	WO
6	Kathalyne Nirubhama (IND)	5	0	5	0						—

Source: OCA

==== Knockout round ====
28 September

Semifinals			Gold medal match
Nguyễn Thị Ánh Nguyệt (VIE)	21	21
Wong Weng Man (MAC)	5	6	Nguyễn Thị Ánh Nguyệt (VIE)	W	O
Sasiwimol Janthasit (THA)	15	14	Lin Xiuting (CHN)
Lin Xiuting (CHN)	21	21

=== Women's doubles ===
==== Preliminary ====
26 September

Pos	Team	Pld	W	L	Pts	VIE	THA	CHN	MAC	HKG	IND
1	Nguyễn Thị Đào (VIE) Hoàng Thị Trà My (VIE)	5	5	0	10	—	2–0	2–0	2–0	2–0	2–0
2	Sasiwimol Janthasit (THA) Masaya Duangsri (THA)	5	4	1	9	7, 19	—	2–0	2–0	2–0	WO
3	Lin Xiuting (CHN) Liang Yingying (CHN)	5	3	2	8	13, 16	17, 16	—	2–0	2–0	WO
4	Lam Ka Man (MAC) Leong On Kei (MAC)	5	2	3	7	17, 10	14, 16	8, 18	—	2–0	WO
5	Mak Kwok Hing (HKG) Lo Wai Ming (HKG)	5	1	4	6	6, 7	8, 11	15, 15	20, 13	—	2–0
6	Nirmala Daisy Bala (IND) Kathalyne Nirubhama (IND)	5	0	5	2	1, 1				3, 5	—

Source: OCA

==== Knockout round ====
Semifinals; 26 September			Gold medal match 27 September
Nguyễn Thị Đào (VIE); Hoàng Thị Trà My (VIE)	21	21
Lam Ka Man (MAC); Leong On Kei (MAC)	8	4	Nguyễn Thị Đào (VIE); Hoàng Thị Trà My (VIE)	21	21
Lin Xiuting (CHN); Liang Yingying (CHN)	21	21	Lin Xiuting (CHN); Liang Yingying (CHN)	11	9
Sasiwimol Janthasit (THA); Masaya Duangsri (THA)	17	13

=== Women's team ===
==== Preliminary ====
28–29 September

Pos	Team	Pld	W	L	Pts	VIE	THA	CHN	MAC	HKG
1	Vietnam	4	4	0	8	—	2–0	2–0	2–0	2–0
2	Thailand	4	3	1	6	17, 14	—	2–1	2–0	2–0
3	China	4	2	2	4	14, 10	18, −13, 16	—	2–0	2–0
4	Macau	4	1	3	2	12, 10	17, 24	17, 11	—	2–1
5	Hong Kong	4	0	4	0	4, 2	6, 7	5, 7	10, −18, 13	—

Source: OCA

==== Knockout round ====
30 September

Semifinals			Gold medal match
Vietnam	21	21
Macau	9	11	Vietnam	21	21
China	11	16	Thailand	12	13
Thailand	21	21

=== Mixed doubles ===
27 September

==== Preliminary ====
Pos	Team	Pld	W	L	Pts	VIE	CHN	THA	MAC	HKG	IND
1	Trần Thanh Điền (VIE) Nguyễn Thị Thủy Tiên (VIE)	5	5	0	10	—	2–0	2–0	2–0	2–0	2–0
2	Mai Yutian (CHN) Li Siwen (CHN)	5	4	1	9	12, 12	—	2–0	2–0	2–0	2–0
3	Sorrasak Thaosiri (THA) Masaya Duangsri (THA)	5	3	2	8	13, 9	19, 19	—	2–1	2–0	2–0
4	Tam Chi Kin (MAC) Leong On Kei (MAC)	5	2	3	7	9, 15	16, 25	8, −18, 19	—	2–0	2–0
5	Anthony Cheung (HKG) Fung Mun Yee (HKG)	5	1	4	6	9, 12	11, 12	12, 12	13, 14	—	2–0
6	Murugan Kajendran (IND) Kathalyne Nirubhama (IND)	5	0	5	5	2, 6	5, 3	4, 2	3, 3	10, 13	—

Source: OCA

==== Knockout round ====
Semifinals			Gold medal match
Trần Thanh Điền (VIE); Nguyễn Thị Thủy Tiên (VIE)	21	21
Tam Chi Kin (MAC); Leong On Kei (MAC)	9	14	Trần Thanh Điền (VIE); Nguyễn Thị Thủy Tiên (VIE)	21	21
Mai Yutian (CHN); Li Siwen (CHN)	18	18	Sorrasak Thaosiri (THA); Masaya Duangsri (THA)	9	14
Sorrasak Thaosiri (THA); Masaya Duangsri (THA)	21	21
