= Coastal rowing at the 2016 Asian Beach Games =

- Venue: Biển Đông Park
- Dates: 27 September – 1 October 2016

Coastal rowing sprint competition at the 2016 Asian Beach Games was held in Da Nang, Vietnam from 27 September to 1 October 2016 at Bien Dong Park.

== Medalists ==
=== Men ===
Event	Gold	Silver	Bronze
Solo	Nuttapong Sangpromcharee; Thailand	Law Hiu Fung; Hong Kong	Đặng Minh Huy; Vietnam
Double sculls	China; Zang Ha; Li Laifu	Hong Kong; Chiu Hin Chun; Tang Chiu Mang	Thailand; Sitthakarn Paisanwan; Somporn Mueangkhot
Coxed quadruple sculls	Thailand; Sakon Somwang; Sornram Sinlapasorn; Tachanattanya Sarakun; Porntawat Inlee; Natawas Chaovakijworachid	Vietnam; Nguyễn Hữu Hoàng; Trần Ngọc Đức; Trần Đăng Dũng; Pham Minh Chính; Trần Quang Tùng	China; Zhou Jiaqi; Bao Yongzhi; Chen Xianheng; Chen Xianfeng; Chen Rui

=== Women ===
Event	Gold	Silver	Bronze
Solo	Chelsea Corputty; Indonesia	Tippaporn Pitukpaothai; Thailand	Hồ Thị Lý; Vietnam
Double sculls	Thailand; Matinee Raruen; Sawittree Laksoongnoen	Hong Kong; Lee Ka Man; Lee Yuen Yin	Indonesia; Yayah Rokayah; Syiva Lisdiana
Coxed quadruple sculls	China; Wang Liang; Zhang Jie; Zhang Jiejie; Wu Ying; Yang Min	Indonesia; Yuniarti; Endang Sri Hevina; Wahyuni; Syiva Lisdiana; Wa Ode Fitri Rahmanjani	Vietnam; Nguyễn Lâm Kiều Diễm; Nguyễn Thị Thanh Nhàn; Lương Thị Yến; Trần Thị An; Trần Thị Sâm

== Medal table ==
Rank	Nation	Gold	Silver	Bronze	Total
1	Thailand (THA)	3	1	1	5
2	China (CHN)	2	0	1	3
3	Indonesia (INA)	1	1	1	3
4	Hong Kong (HKG)	0	3	0	3
5	Vietnam (VIE)	0	1	3	4
Totals (5 entries)		6	6	6	18

== Results ==
=== Men ===
==== Solo ====
===== Time trial =====
27 September

Rank	Athlete	Time trial	Repechage
1	Nuttapong Sangpromcharee (THA)	3:00.05	
2	Law Hiu Fung (HKG)	3:04.49	
3	Đặng Minh Huy (VIE)	3:07.40	
4	Edgar Ilas (PHI)	3:19.71	
5	Chi Xinxin (CHN)	3:22.14	
6	Muhad Yakin (INA)	3:22.91	
7	Justin Ong (SGP)	3:42.46	
8	Hamad Al-Matrooshi (UAE)	4:23.64	3:21.25
9	Zuraaru Salaah (MDV)	3:43.73	3:48.00

===== Knockout round =====
28 September

Quarterfinals
Nuttapong Sangpromcharee (THA)	2:55.74
Hamad Al-Matrooshi (UAE)	3:09.05
Edgar Ilas (PHI)	3:09.24
Muhad Yakin (INA)	3:09.01
Law Hiu Fung (HKG)	2:59.10
Justin Ong (SGP)	3:37.58
Đặng Minh Huy (VIE)	3:03.56
Chi Xinxin (CHN)	3:16.81

Semifinals 1/2
Nuttapong Sangpromcharee (THA)	2:54.21
Muhad Yakin (INA)	3:09.92
Law Hiu Fung (HKG)	3:02.26
Đặng Minh Huy (VIE)	3:06.10

Final 1
Nuttapong Sangpromcharee (THA)	2:57.93
Law Hiu Fung (HKG)	2:58.32
Final 2
Muhad Yakin (INA)	3:24.25
Đặng Minh Huy (VIE)	3:08.60

Semifinals 3/4
Hamad Al-Matrooshi (UAE)	3:18.94
Edgar Ilas (PHI)	3:08.30
Justin Ong (SGP)	3:35.40
Chi Xinxin (CHN)	3:25.40

Final 3
Edgar Ilas (PHI)	3:02.80
Chi Xinxin (CHN)	3:11.93
Final 4
Hamad Al-Matrooshi (UAE)	4:19.59
Justin Ong (SGP)	4:00.84

==== Double sculls ====
===== Time trial =====
27 September

Rank	Team	Time trial	Repechage
1	Thailand (THA); Sitthakarn Paisanwan; Somporn Mueangkhot	2:44.77	
2	China (CHN); Zang Ha; Li Laifu	2:49.46	
3	Vietnam (VIE); Nguyễn Văn Tuấn; Nguyễn Văn Đức	2:49.86	
4	Hong Kong (HKG); Chiu Hin Chun; Tang Chiu Mang	2:54.01	
5	Philippines (PHI); Benjamin Tolentino; Nestor Cordova	3:01.97	
6	Indonesia (INA); Ardi Isadi; Tanzil Hadid	3:06.51	
7	United Arab Emirates (UAE); Khamis Al-Shamsi; Ahmed Al-Hammadi	3:15.87	
8	Singapore (SGP); Budiman Osman; Ahmad Faizal	3:21.21	3:27.94
9	Maldives (MDV); Hussein Mauroof; Abdul Baais Abdul Zubair	3:52.82	3:35.13

===== Knockout round =====
29 September

Quarterfinals
Sitthakarn Paisanwan (THA); Somporn Mueangkhot (THA)	2:43.46
Budiman Osman (SGP); Ahmad Faizal (SGP)	3:18.49
Chiu Hin Chun (HKG); Tang Chiu Mang (HKG)	2:41.84
Ardi Isadi (INA); Tanzil Hadid (INA)	2:50.73
Zang Ha (CHN); Li Laifu (CHN)	2:43.75
Khamis Al-Shamsi (UAE); Ahmed Al-Hammadi (UAE)	2:57.68
Nguyễn Văn Tuấn (VIE); Nguyễn Văn Đức (VIE)	2:36.02
Benjamin Tolentino (PHI); Nestor Cordova (PHI)	2:55.51

Semifinals 1/2
Sitthakarn Paisanwan (THA); Somporn Mueangkhot (THA)	2:40.94
Chiu Hin Chun (HKG); Tang Chiu Mang (HKG)	2:39.87
Zang Ha (CHN); Li Laifu (CHN)	2:39.23
Nguyễn Văn Tuấn (VIE); Nguyễn Văn Đức (VIE)	2:39.51

Final 1
Chiu Hin Chun (HKG); Tang Chiu Mang (HKG)	2:56.08
Zang Ha (CHN); Li Laifu (CHN)	2:45.39
Final 2
Sitthakarn Paisanwan (THA); Somporn Mueangkhot (THA)	2:51.08
Nguyễn Văn Tuấn (VIE); Nguyễn Văn Đức (VIE)	3:16.67

Semifinals 3/4
Budiman Osman (SGP); Ahmad Faizal (SGP)	3:24.05
Ardi Isadi (INA); Tanzil Hadid (INA)	2:58.41
Khamis Al-Shamsi (UAE); Ahmed Al-Hammadi (UAE)	2:59.52
Benjamin Tolentino (PHI); Nestor Cordova (PHI)	3:00.79

Final 3
Ardi Isadi (INA); Tanzil Hadid (INA)	2:47.96
Khamis Al-Shamsi (UAE); Ahmed Al-Hammadi (UAE)	3:23.03
Final 4
Budiman Osman (SGP); Ahmad Faizal (SGP)	3:20.38
Benjamin Tolentino (PHI); Nestor Cordova (PHI)	3:12.63

==== Coxed quadruple sculls ====
1 October

===== Time trial =====
Rank	Team	Time
1	Thailand (THA)	2:29.92
2	Vietnam (VIE)	2:31.27
3	China (CHN)	2:33.41
4	Indonesia (INA)	2:35.27
5	Hong Kong (HKG)	2:39.89
6	United Arab Emirates (UAE)	2:49.83

===== Knockout round =====
Repechage
Indonesia	2:35.59
United Arab Emirates	2:47.01
China	2:35.61
Hong Kong	2:36.04

Semifinals
Thailand	2:31.76
Indonesia	2:37.01
Vietnam	2:33.31
China	2:39.24

Final 1
Thailand	2:33.70
Vietnam	2:39.83
Final 2
Indonesia	2:39.48
China	2:37.06

Final 3
United Arab Emirates	2:54.79
Hong Kong	2:42.01

=== Women ===
==== Solo ====
===== Time trial =====
27 September

Rank	Athlete	Time
1	Hồ Thị Lý (VIE)	3:19.62
2	Tippaporn Pitukpaothai (THA)	3:22.36
3	Zhou Yue (CHN)	3:23.84
4	Chelsea Corputty (INA)	3:28.27
5	Leung Hiu Sum (HKG)	3:35.91
6	Joan Poh (SGP)	4:04.23
7	Athfa Moosa Jamal (MDV)	4:09.16
8	Maha Al-Blooshi (UAE)	4:42.45

===== Knockout round =====
28 September

Quarterfinals
Hồ Thị Lý (VIE)	4:18.34
Maha Al-Blooshi (UAE)	5:51.69
Chelsea Corputty (INA)	3:55.93
Joan Poh (SGP)	4:58.63
Tippaporn Pitukpaothai (THA)	4:01.80
Athfa Moosa Jamal (MDV)	6:21.61
Zhou Yue (CHN)	3:54.87
Leung Hiu Sum (HKG)	4:04.48

Semifinals 1/2
Hồ Thị Lý (VIE)	3:54.72
Chelsea Corputty (INA)	3:44.80
Tippaporn Pitukpaothai (THA)	3:51.96
Zhou Yue (CHN)	4:02.74

Final 1
Chelsea Corputty (INA)	3:40.09
Tippaporn Pitukpaothai (THA)	3:53.60
Final 2
Hồ Thị Lý (VIE)	3:40.31
Zhou Yue (CHN)	4:14.53

Semifinals 3/4
Maha Al-Blooshi (UAE)	5:43.92
Joan Poh (SGP)	4:47.20
Athfa Moosa Jamal (MDV)	5:42.84
Leung Hiu Sum (HKG)	4:17.69

Final 3
Joan Poh (SGP)	4:34.15
Leung Hiu Sum (HKG)	4:03.30
Final 4
Maha Al-Blooshi (UAE)	7:04.82
Athfa Moosa Jamal (MDV)	5:59.30

==== Double sculls ====
===== Time trial =====
27 September

Rank	Team	Time
1	Hong Kong (HKG); Lee Ka Man; Lee Yuen Yin	3:05.18
2	Thailand (THA); Matinee Raruen; Sawittree Laksoongnoen	3:08.17
3	Indonesia (INA); Yayah Rokayah; Syiva Lisdiana	3:11.96
4	Vietnam (VIE); Phạm Thị Nhi; Nguyễn Thị Thu Hà	3:25.74
5	China (CHN); Liu Ruiqi; Yang Min	3:44.29
6	Maldives (MDV); Fathimath Afaa Ali; Shaafia Mohamed Didi	4:13.39

===== Knockout round =====
27–29 September

Repechage
Phạm Thị Nhi (VIE); Nguyễn Thị Thu Hà (VIE)	3:20.08
Fathimath Afaa Ali (MDV); Shaafia Mohamed Didi (MDV)	4:30.85
Yayah Rokayah (INA); Syiva Lisdiana (INA)	3:06.55
Liu Ruiqi (CHN); Yang Min (CHN)	3:11.78

Semifinals 1/2
Lee Ka Man (HKG); Lee Yuen Yin (HKG)	3:15.71
Phạm Thị Nhi (VIE); Nguyễn Thị Thu Hà (VIE)	3:19.06
Matinee Raruen (THA); Sawittree Laksoongnoen (THA)	3:07.55
Yayah Rokayah (INA); Syiva Lisdiana (INA)	3:16.62

Final 1
Lee Ka Man (HKG); Lee Yuen Yin (HKG)	3:38.14
Matinee Raruen (THA); Sawittree Laksoongnoen (THA)	3:14.33
Final 2
Phạm Thị Nhi (VIE); Nguyễn Thị Thu Hà (VIE)	3:29.67
Yayah Rokayah (INA); Syiva Lisdiana (INA)	3:21.02

Final 3
Fathimath Afaa Ali (MDV); Shaafia Mohamed Didi (MDV)	6:04.46
Liu Ruiqi (CHN); Yang Min (CHN)	3:17.26

==== Coxed quadruple sculls ====
1 October

===== Time trial =====
Rank	Team	Time
1	China (CHN)	2:47.55
2	Vietnam (VIE)	2:52.40
3	Indonesia (INA)	2:54.58
4	Hong Kong (HKG)	3:06.47
5	Thailand (THA)	3:07.54

===== Knockout round =====
Repechage
Hong Kong	3:03.26
Thailand	3:05.20

Semifinals
China	2:47.63
Hong Kong	3:05.65
Vietnam	4:01.55
Indonesia	3:01.66

Final 1
China	2:56.49
Indonesia	3:09.56
Final 2
Hong Kong	3:16.24
Vietnam	2:56.32
