= Independent Olympic Athletes at the 2016 Asian Beach Games =

- IOC code: IOA
- NOC: International Olympic Committee

in Đà Nẵng
- Competitors: 1 in 1 sport
- Medals Ranked 34thth: Gold Silver Bronze 1 Total 1

Asian Beach Games appearances
- 2010; 2012; 2014; 2016

Other related appearances
- Kuwait (2008, 2014)

A Kuwaiti athlete competed at the 2016 Asian Beach Games in Danang, Vietnam as part of the Independent Athletes from September 24 to October 5, 2016. The sole competitor competed under the Olympic flag, as the Kuwait Olympic Committee had been suspended by the International Olympic Committee (IOC) for the second time in five years due to governmental interference.

== Medalists ==
Medal	Name	Sport	Event	Date
Bronze	Jarrah Al Hazza	Ju-jitsu	Men's Ne-waza −62 kg	26 Sep 2016
