= Muaythai at the 2016 Asian Beach Games =

- Venue: Biển Đông Park
- Dates: 21–26 September 2016

Muaythai competition at the 2016 Asian Beach Games was held in Da Nang, Vietnam from 21 to 26 September 2016.

== Medalists ==
=== Men ===
Event	Gold	Silver	Bronze
Light flyweight 45–48 kg	Phitsanu Pinthong; Thailand	Bryan Tee; Singapore	Hasan Mustafa; Iraq
Light flyweight 45–48 kg	Phitsanu Pinthong; Thailand	Bryan Tee; Singapore	Lê Hoàng Đức; Vietnam
Flyweight; 48–51 kg	Arnon Phonkrathok; Thailand	Yelaman Sayassatov; Kazakhstan	Nguyễn Kế Nhơn; Vietnam
Flyweight; 48–51 kg	Arnon Phonkrathok; Thailand	Yelaman Sayassatov; Kazakhstan	Luo Chenghao; China
Bantamweight; 51–54 kg	Chotichanin Kokkrachai; Thailand	Yoon Deok-jae; South Korea	Kwok Wai Hon; Hong Kong
Bantamweight; 51–54 kg	Chotichanin Kokkrachai; Thailand	Yoon Deok-jae; South Korea	Phillip Delarmino; Philippines
Featherweight; 54–57 kg	Wiwat Khamtha; Thailand	Ishan Galiyev; Kazakhstan	Nguyễn Tăng Quyền; Vietnam
Featherweight; 54–57 kg	Wiwat Khamtha; Thailand	Ishan Galiyev; Kazakhstan	Choe Seung-gyu; South Korea
Lightweight; 57–60 kg	Nguyễn Trần Duy Nhất; Vietnam	Wang Wenfeng; China	Ahmed Abbood; Iraq
Lightweight; 57–60 kg	Nguyễn Trần Duy Nhất; Vietnam	Wang Wenfeng; China	Prawit Chilnak; Thailand
Light welterweight 60–63.5 kg	Chonlawit Preedasak; Thailand	Võ Văn Đài; Vietnam	Ameer Ibrahim; Iraq
Light welterweight 60–63.5 kg	Chonlawit Preedasak; Thailand	Võ Văn Đài; Vietnam	Jonathan Polosan; Philippines
Welterweight; 63.5–67 kg	Kaveh Soleimani; Iran	Zhanibek Kanatbayev; Kazakhstan	Wang Yuanlei; China
Welterweight; 63.5–67 kg	Kaveh Soleimani; Iran	Zhanibek Kanatbayev; Kazakhstan	Akram Hasan; Iraq
Light middleweight 67–71 kg	Masoud Minaei; Iran	Trương Quốc Hùng; Vietnam	Rustem Akzhanov; Kazakhstan
Light middleweight 67–71 kg	Masoud Minaei; Iran	Trương Quốc Hùng; Vietnam	Shan Yanbin; China
Middleweight; 71–75 kg	Zhang Yongkang; China	Harish Baghel; India	Jay Harold Gregorio; Philippines
Middleweight; 71–75 kg	Zhang Yongkang; China	Harish Baghel; India	None awarded
Light heavyweight 75–81 kg	Luo Can; China	Mohammad Salama; Jordan	Mohammad Fneich; Lebanon
Light heavyweight 75–81 kg	Luo Can; China	Mohammad Salama; Jordan	None awarded

=== Women ===
Event	Gold	Silver	Bronze
Light flyweight 45–48 kg	Suphisara Konlak; Thailand	Wu Hoi Yan; Hong Kong	Yeh Hui-tzu; Chinese Taipei
Light flyweight 45–48 kg	Suphisara Konlak; Thailand	Wu Hoi Yan; Hong Kong	Cheryl Gwa; Singapore
Flyweight; 48–51 kg	Bùi Yến Ly; Vietnam	Nitiyakorn Srisalai; Thailand	Pan Ting-wai; Chinese Taipei
Flyweight; 48–51 kg	Bùi Yến Ly; Vietnam	Nitiyakorn Srisalai; Thailand	Mariana Kamra; Lebanon
Bantamweight; 51–54 kg	Yadrung Tehiran; Thailand	Trần Thị Trúc; Vietnam	Linda Hatem; Iraq
Bantamweight; 51–54 kg	Yadrung Tehiran; Thailand	Trần Thị Trúc; Vietnam	Hoàng Minh Huyền; Vietnam
Featherweight; 54–57 kg	Ratchadaphon Wihantamma; Thailand	Phạm Thị Thu; Vietnam	Nguyễn Thị Hồng Nhung; Vietnam
Featherweight; 54–57 kg	Ratchadaphon Wihantamma; Thailand	Phạm Thị Thu; Vietnam	Ýaňyl Kawisowa; Turkmenistan
Lightweight; 57–60 kg	Bùi Thị Hải Yến; Vietnam	Chenchira Wankhruea; Thailand	Lada Chigirkina; Kazakhstan
Lightweight; 57–60 kg	Bùi Thị Hải Yến; Vietnam	Chenchira Wankhruea; Thailand	Jennet Aýnazarowa; Turkmenistan
Light welterweight 60–63.5 kg	Nguyễn Thị Ngọc; Vietnam	Rola Khaled; Lebanon	Nguyễn Thị Bích Ngọc; Vietnam
Light welterweight 60–63.5 kg	Nguyễn Thị Ngọc; Vietnam	Rola Khaled; Lebanon	Yang Ching-chin; Chinese Taipei

== Medal table ==
Rank	Nation	Gold	Silver	Bronze	Total
1	Thailand (THA)	8	2	1	11
2	Vietnam (VIE)	4	4	6	14
3	China (CHN)	2	1	3	6
4	Iran (IRI)	2	0	0	2
5	Kazakhstan (KAZ)	0	3	2	5
6	Lebanon (LIB)	0	1	2	3
7	Hong Kong (HKG)	0	1	1	2
7	Singapore (SGP)	0	1	1	2
7	South Korea (KOR)	0	1	1	2
10	India (IND)	0	1	0	1
10	Jordan (JOR)	0	1	0	1
12	Iraq (IRQ)	0	0	5	5
13	Chinese Taipei (TPE)	0	0	3	3
13	Philippines (PHI)	0	0	3	3
15	Turkmenistan (TKM)	0	0	2	2
Totals (15 entries)		16	16	30	62

== Results ==
=== Men ===
==== 48 kg ====
Quarterfinals; 21 September
Chethan Anjaneya (IND)
Phitsanu Pinthong (THA)	RSCB

Semifinals; 23 September
Hasan Mustafa (IRQ)	28
Bryan Tee (SGP)	29
Lê Hoàng Đức (VIE)	28
Phitsanu Pinthong (THA)	29

Final; 26 September
Bryan Tee (SGP)	27
Phitsanu Pinthong (THA)	30

==== 51 kg ====
Quarterfinals; 21 September
Anas Khalaf (JOR)	27
Nguyễn Kế Nhơn (VIE)	30
Gary Tang (HKG)	27
Arnon Phonkrathok (THA)	30
Rais Mohd Junaidi (MAS)
Luo Chenghao (CHN)	RSCB

Semifinals; 23 September
Yelaman Sayassatov (KAZ)	30
Nguyễn Kế Nhơn (VIE)	27
Arnon Phonkrathok (THA)	30
Luo Chenghao (CHN)	27

Final; 26 September
Yelaman Sayassatov (KAZ)	28
Arnon Phonkrathok (THA)	29

==== 54 kg ====
Round of 16; 21 September
Phillip Delarmino (PHI)	30
Resul Araşow (TKM)	27

Quarterfinals; 22 September
Chotichanin Kokkrachai (THA)	RSCI
Lokman Akimi (MAS)
Ali Mahmood (IRQ)	28
Kwok Wai Hon (HKG)	29
Ilyas Mussin (KAZ)	28
Yoon Deok-jae (KOR)	29
Diyorbek Turumov (UZB)
Phillip Delarmino (PHI)	WO

Semifinals; 23 September
Chotichanin Kokkrachai (THA)	30
Kwok Wai Hon (HKG)	27
Yoon Deok-jae (KOR)	29
Phillip Delarmino (PHI)	28

Final; 26 September
Chotichanin Kokkrachai (THA)	29
Yoon Deok-jae (KOR)	28

==== 57 kg ====
Round of 16; 21 September
Arsen Zarylbekov (KGZ)	WO
Jakhangir Yuldashev (UZB)
Choe Seung-gyu (KOR)	30
Yang Ming (CHN)	27
Peter Mark Bayaras (PHI)
Jamal Madani (IRI)	RSCB
Wiwat Khamtha (THA)	30
Khalid Jawad (IRQ)	27

Quarterfinals; 22 September
Rüstem Baýramdurdyýew (TKM)
Ishan Galiyev (KAZ)	RSCO
Saifullah Ismail (MAS)	27
Nguyễn Tăng Quyền (VIE)	30
Arsen Zarylbekov (KGZ)
Choe Seung-gyu (KOR)	RSCO
Jamal Madani (IRI)	27
Wiwat Khamtha (THA)	30

Semifinals; 25 September
Ishan Galiyev (KAZ)	30
Nguyễn Tăng Quyền (VIE)	27
Choe Seung-gyu (KOR)
Wiwat Khamtha (THA)	KOB

Final; 26 September
Ishan Galiyev (KAZ)	27
Wiwat Khamtha (THA)	30

==== 60 kg ====
Round of 16; 21 September
Mehrdad Sayyadi (IRI)	30
Ivan Dobrynin (KAZ)	27
Ilkhomjon Rustamov (UZB)	WO
Manuchehr Nazrivali (TJK)
Prawit Chilnak (THA)	30
Kim Min-hwan (KOR)	27

Quarterfinals; 22 September
Ahmed Abbood (IRQ)	29
Mirbek Sartkalmakov (KGZ)	28
Saif Zakzook (JOR)	28
Wang Wenfeng (CHN)	29
Nguyễn Trần Duy Nhất (VIE)	30
Mehrdad Sayyadi (IRI)	27
Ilkhomjon Rustamov (UZB)
Prawit Chilnak (THA)	KOB

Semifinals; 25 September
Ahmed Abbood (IRQ)	27
Wang Wenfeng (CHN)	30
Nguyễn Trần Duy Nhất (VIE)	29
Prawit Chilnak (THA)	28

Final; 26 September
Wang Wenfeng (CHN)	27
Nguyễn Trần Duy Nhất (VIE)	30

==== 63.5 kg ====
Quarterfinals; 22 September
Ameer Ibrahim (IRQ)	WO
Shuhratjon Isvalyzoda (TJK)
Võ Văn Đài (VIE)	29
Abil Galiyev (KAZ)	28
Woo Seung-bum (KOR)	27
Chonlawit Preedasak (THA)	30
Islam Asenbaev (UZB)
Jonathan Polosan (PHI)	WO

Semifinals; 25 September
Ameer Ibrahim (IRQ)	28
Võ Văn Đài (VIE)	29
Chonlawit Preedasak (THA)	30
Jonathan Polosan (PHI)	27

Final; 26 September
Võ Văn Đài (VIE)
Chonlawit Preedasak (THA)	RSCH

==== 67 kg ====
Round of 16; 21 September
Sarawut Singin (THA)	29
Bekzhan Matysaev (KGZ)	29
Akram Hasan (IRQ)	RSCH
Nguyễn Văn Yên (VIE)
Firuz Sharifov (TJK)
Zhanibek Kanatbayev (KAZ)	WO
Ahmad Ondash (LIB)
Mustafa Saparmyradow (TKM)	RSCH

Quarterfinals; 22 September
Bobirjon Tagaev (UZB)
Kaveh Soleimani (IRI)	WO
Pan Hong-min (TPE)	27
Wang Yuanlei (CHN)	30
Sarawut Singin (THA)
Akram Hasan (IRQ)	RSCH
Zhanibek Kanatbayev (KAZ)	29
Mustafa Saparmyradow (TKM)	28

Semifinals; 25 September
Kaveh Soleimani (IRI)	RSCO
Wang Yuanlei (CHN)
Akram Hasan (IRQ)	27
Zhanibek Kanatbayev (KAZ)	30

Final; 26 September
Kaveh Soleimani (IRI)	KOH
Zhanibek Kanatbayev (KAZ)

==== 71 kg ====
Quarterfinals; 23 September
Trương Quốc Hùng (VIE)	RSCH
Muhammetberdi Rowşanow (TKM)
Zulfali Latifov (TJK)
Rustem Akzhanov (KAZ)	WO
Masoud Minaei (IRI)	RET
Na Seung-il (KOR)
Shan Yanbin (CHN)	30
Adil Jawad (IRQ)	27

Semifinals; 25 September
Trương Quốc Hùng (VIE)	29
Rustem Akzhanov (KAZ)	28
Masoud Minaei (IRI)	RSCO
Shan Yanbin (CHN)

Final; 26 September
Trương Quốc Hùng (VIE)
Masoud Minaei (IRI)	RSCH

==== 75 kg ====
Quarterfinals; 23 September
Jay Harold Gregorio (PHI)	RET
Ongar Baymuratov (UZB)
Ýusup Bäşimow (TKM)	27
Zhang Yongkang (CHN)	30

Semifinals; 25 September
Saymukhammad Sharipov (TJK)
Harish Baghel (IND)	WO
Jay Harold Gregorio (PHI)
Zhang Yongkang (CHN)	RET

Final; 26 September
Harish Baghel (IND)
Zhang Yongkang (CHN)	RSCH

==== 81 kg ====
Quarterfinals; 23 September
Muhammadalijon Chakalov (TJK)	DSQ
Islomjon Marufov (UZB)	DSQ

Semifinals; 25 September
Mohammad Fneich (LIB)
Mohammad Salama (JOR)	RSCO
Luo Can (CHN)
Bye

Final; 26 September
Mohammad Salama (JOR)	28
Luo Can (CHN)	29

=== Women ===
==== 48 kg ====
Quarterfinals; 21 September
Ramesh Rashi (IND)
Wu Hoi Yan (HKG)	RSCB
Arlyn Ranes (PHI)
Cheryl Gwa (SGP)	RSCB

Semifinals; 23 September
Suphisara Konlak (THA)	RSCB
Yeh Hui-tzu (TPE)
Wu Hoi Yan (HKG)	30
Cheryl Gwa (SGP)	27

Final; 26 September
Suphisara Konlak (THA)	30
Wu Hoi Yan (HKG)	27

==== 51 kg ====
Semifinals; 23 September		Final; 26 September
Pan Ting-wai (TPE)
Bùi Yến Ly (VIE)	RSCO	Bùi Yến Ly (VIE)	30
Mariana Kamra (LIB)	27	Nitiyakorn Srisalai (THA)	27
Nitiyakorn Srisalai (THA)	30

==== 54 kg ====
Semifinals; 23 September		Final; 26 September
Linda Hatem (IRQ)
Yadrung Tehiran (THA)	RSCB	Yadrung Tehiran (THA)	30
Trần Thị Trúc (VIE)	WO	Trần Thị Trúc (VIE)	27
Hoàng Minh Huyền (VIE)

==== 57 kg ====
Semifinals; 25 September		Final; 26 September
Phạm Thị Thu (VIE)	WO
Nguyễn Thị Hồng Nhung (VIE)		Phạm Thị Thu (VIE)	27
Ratchadaphon Wihantamma (THA)	RSCO	Ratchadaphon Wihantamma (THA)	30
Ýaňyl Kawisowa (TKM)

==== 60 kg ====
Semifinals; 25 September		Final; 26 September
Chenchira Wankhruea (THA)	30
Lada Chigirkina (KAZ)	27	Chenchira Wankhruea (THA)
Jennet Aýnazarowa (TKM)	28	Bùi Thị Hải Yến (VIE)	RSCH
Bùi Thị Hải Yến (VIE)	29

==== 63.5 kg ====
Semifinals; 25 September		Final; 26 September
Nguyễn Thị Ngọc (VIE)	30
Nguyễn Thị Bích Ngọc (VIE)	27	Nguyễn Thị Ngọc (VIE)	29
Rola Khaled (LIB)	RSCO	Rola Khaled (LIB)	28
Yang Ching-chin (TPE)
