= Asian Championship =

International sports competition

Countries usually participating in Asian championships. Note the difference to the geographical borders of Asia.

An Asian Championship is a top level international sports competition between Asian athletes or sports teams representing their respective countries or professional sports clubs.

== List of championships ==
Aquatics and water sports

- Asian Aquatics Championships
- Asian Water Polo Championship

Archery

- Asian Archery Championships

Athletics

- Asian Athletics Championships

Badminton

- Badminton Asia Championships

Baseball and softball

- Asian Baseball Championship
- Women's Baseball Asian Cup
- Men's Softball Asia Cup
- Women's Softball Asia Cup

Basketball

- FIBA Asia Cup
- FIBA Women's Asia Cup

Boxing

- Asian Amateur Boxing Championships

Canoeing

- Asian Canoeing Championships

Chess

- Asian Chess Championship

Cricket

- Asia Cup
- Women's Asia Cup

Cycling

- Asian Cycling Championships

Fencing

- Asian Fencing Championships

Field hockey

- Men's Hockey Asia Cup
- Women's Hockey Asia Cup

Football

- AFC Asian Cup
- AFC Women's Asia Cup

Gymnastics

- Asian Gymnastics Championships

Handball

- Asian Men's Handball Championship
- Asian Women's Handball Championship

Judo

- Asian Judo Championships

Karate

- Asian Karate Championships

Rowing

- Asian Rowing Championships

Rugby

- Asia Rugby Championship
- Asia Rugby Women's Championship
- Asian Rugby Sevens Series
- Asian Rugby Women's Sevens Series

Sailing

- Asian Championships in Sailing

Shooting

- Asian Shooting Championships

Sport climbing

- IFSC Climbing Asian Championships

Snooking

- ACBS Asian Snooker Championship

Surfing

- Asian Surfing Championships

Table tennis

- Asian Table Tennis Championships

Taekwondo

- Asian Taekwondo Championships

Tennis

- Asian Championships

Volleyball and beach volleyball

- Asian Men's Volleyball Championship
- Asian Women's Volleyball Championship
- AVC Asian Beach Volleyball Championships

Weightlifting

- Asian Weightlifting Championships

Wrestling

- Asian Wrestling Championships

== See also ==
- Asian Games, a multi-sport event between competitors from all nations in Asia
- Championship
- World championship
  - African Championship
  - European Championship
    - European Junior Championships (disambiguation)
  - Oceania Championship
  - Pan American Championship
    - Central American Championships (disambiguation)
    - North American Championship
      - Canadian Championships
    - South American Championship
