= Thailand at the 2016 Asian Beach Games =

- IOC code: THA
- NOC: National Olympic Committee of Thailand
- Website: www.olympicthai.or.th/eng (in English and Thai)

in Đà Nẵng
- Competitors: 297 (166 men & 131 women) in 20 sports
- Flag bearer: Natthanan Junkrajang
- Medals Ranked 2nd: Gold 36 Silver 24 Bronze 30 Total 90

Asian Beach Games appearances
- 2008; 2010; 2012; 2014; 2016; 2026

Thailand competed at the 2016 Asian Beach Games held in Danang, Vietnam from 24 September to 3 October 2016.

== Competitors ==
Thailand competed at the 2016 Asian Beach Games in 20 out of the 22 sports. Team Thailand did not compete in Vietnamese Martial Arts and Vovinam.

Sport	Men	Women	Total
Beach Athletics	18	17	35
Beach Basketball	4	4	8
Beach Handball	10	10	20
Beach Kabaddi	6	6	12
Beach Kurash	4	8	12
Beach Sambo	8	8	16
Beach Sepaktakraw	12	12	24
Beach Soccer	10	0	10
Beach Volleyball	4	4	8
Beach Water Polo	13	0	13
Beach Woodball	10	10	20
Beach Wrestling	3	3	6
Bodybuilding	7	0	7
Coastal Rowing	10	10	20
Ju-Jitsu	12	9	21
Marathon Swimming	4	4	8
Muay Thai	7	5	12
Petanque	9	9	18
Pencak Silat	9	6	15
Shuttlecock	6	6	12
Total	166	131	297

== Medal summary ==
=== Medal by sport ===
Medals by sport
Sport	1st place, gold medalist(s)	2nd place, silver medalist(s)	3rd place, bronze medalist(s)	Total	End
Beach Athletics	2	3	4	9	2nd place, silver medalist(s)
Beach Basketball	0	1	0	1	3rd place, bronze medalist(s)
Beach Handball	0	0	1	1	5
Beach Kabaddi	0	1	0	1	3rd place, bronze medalist(s)
Beach Kurash	0	0	2	2	9
Beach Sambo	0	1	1	2	7
Beach Sepaktakraw	4	0	0	4	1st place, gold medalist(s)
Beach Soccer	0	0	0	0	5
Beach Volleyball	1	0	0	1	2nd place, silver medalist(s)
Beach Water Polo	0	0	0	0	5
Beach Woodball	6	5	1	12	1st place, gold medalist(s)
Beach Wrestling	0	1	3	4	7
Bodybuilding	0	0	1	1	6
Coastal Rowing	3	1	1	5	1st place, gold medalist(s)
Ju-Jitsu	3	3	5	11	3rd place, bronze medalist(s)
Marathon Swimming	1	0	0	1	3rd place, bronze medalist(s)
Muay Thai	8	2	1	11	1st place, gold medalist(s)
Petanque	4	2	2	8	1st place, gold medalist(s)
Pencak Silat	4	1	4	9	2nd place, silver medalist(s)
Shuttlecock	0	3	4	7	3rd place, bronze medalist(s)
Total	36	24	30	90	2nd place, silver medalist(s)

=== Medal by date ===
Medals by date
Day	Date	1st place, gold medalist(s)	2nd place, silver medalist(s)	3rd place, bronze medalist(s)	Total
0	23 Sep 2016	1	0	0	1
1	24 Sep 2016	Opening Ceremony			
2	25 Sep 2016	2	3	3	8
3	26 Sep 2016	12	5	8	25
4	27 Sep 2016	3	4	4	11
5	28 Sep 2016	6	2	5	13
6	29 Sep 2016	3	3	2	8
7	30 Sep 2016	0	3	5	8
8	1 Oct 2016	7	2	2	11
9	2 Oct 2016	2	2	1	5
10	3 Oct 2016	Closing Ceremony			
Total		36	24	30	90

=== Medalists ===
Medal	Name	Sport	Event	Date
Gold	Benjaporn Sriphanomthorn	Marathon Swimming	Women's 5 km	23 Sep 2016
Gold	Phetanun Pronsane	Beach Woodball	Men's Fairway Single	25 Sep 2016
Gold	Varaporn Poorisrisak	Ju-Jitsu	Women's Newaza -49 kg	25 Sep 2016
Gold	Thaloengkiat Phusa-at; Sarawut Sriboonpeng	Beach Petanque	Men's Double	26 Sep 2016
Gold	Thongsri Thamakord; Phantipha Wongchuvej	Beach Petanque	Women's Double	26 Sep 2016
Gold	Rapeephon Rakteepueng; Ratchanee Na Nakhon	Beach Woodball	Women's Fairway Double	26 Sep 2016
Gold	Thammanun Pothaisong; Warut Netpong	Ju-Jitsu	Men's Show System (Duo)	26 Sep 2016
Gold	Phitsanu Pinthong	Muay Thai	Men's Light Flyweight 45–48 kg	26 Sep 2016
Gold	Arnon Phonkrathok	Muay Thai	Men's Flyweight 48–51 kg	26 Sep 2016
Gold	Chotichanin Kokkrachai	Muay Thai	Men's Bantamweight 51–54 kg	26 Sep 2016
Gold	Wiwat Khamtha	Muay Thai	Men's Featherweight 54–57 kg	26 Sep 2016
Gold	Chonlawit Preedasak	Muay Thai	Men's Light Welterweight 60-63.5 kg	26 Sep 2016
Gold	Suphisara Konlak	Muay Thai	Women's Light Flyweight 45–48 kg	26 Sep 2016
Gold	Yadrung Tehiran	Muay Thai	Women's Bantamweight 51–54 kg	26 Sep 2016
Gold	Ratchadaphon Wihantamma	Muay Thai	Women's Featherweight 54–57 kg	26 Sep 2016
Gold	Nutchanon Kongpolprom; Klissana Khaodee	Beach Woodball	Mixed Fairway Double	27 Sep 2016
Gold	Ratcharat Yimprai; Arreewan Chansri	Ju-Jitsu	Mixed Show System (Duo)	27 Sep 2016
Gold	Ilyas Sadara	Pencak Silat	Men's Tunggal	27 Sep 2016
Gold	Kritsada Namsuwun; Aphisit Promkaew; Jaran Sathoengram; Bandit Chuangchai	Beach Athletics	Men's 4x60m Relay	28 Sep 2016
Gold	Parichat Charoensuk; Khanrutai Pakdee; Phensri Chairoek; Supawan Thipat	Beach Athletics	Women's 4x60m Relay	28 Sep 2016
Gold	Wanchaloem Srimueang	Beach Petanque	Men's Single	28 Sep 2016
Gold	Kattika Aramchote	Beach Petanque	Women's Single	28 Sep 2016
Gold	Nuttapong Sangpromcharee	Beach Rowing	Men's Solo (CM1x)	28 Sep 2016
Gold	Orathai Buasri; Thiwaphon Nueangchamnong; Somruedee Pruepruk; Jariya Seesawad; Thidarat Soda; Nisa Thanaattawut	Beach Sepaktakraw	Women's Regu	28 Sep 2016
Gold	Matinee Raruen; Sawittree Laksoongnoen	Beach Rowing	Women's Double Sculls (CW2x)	29 Sep 2016
Gold	Phakpong Dejaroen; Seksan Tubtong; Yotsawat Uthaijaronsri; Komkid Suapimpa; Uthen Kukheaw; Jackrit Wijara	Beach Sepaktakraw	Men's Regu	29 Sep 2016
Gold	Kiadtisak Saengrit; Nakorn Nualraksa; Nutchanon Kongpolprom; Phetanun Pronsane	Beach Woodball	Men's Fairway Team	29 Sep 2016
Gold	Sakon Somwang; Sornram Sinlapasorn; Tachanattanya Sarakun; Porntawat Inlee; Natawas Chaovakijworachid	Beach Rowing	Men's Coxed Quadruple Sculls (CM4x+)	1 Oct 2016
Gold	Orathai Buasri; Jiranan Bunvisas; Siriphol Chaiyasit; Natkidta Inbua; Nongnuch Inruengsorn; Thiwaphon Nueangchamnong; Somruedee Pruepruk; Priyapat Saton; Jariya Seesawad; Thidarat Soda; Nisa Thanaattawut; Apinya Thongpoo	Beach Sepaktakraw	Women's Team	1 Oct 2016
Gold	Nutchanon Kongpolprom; Nakorn Nualraksa; Phetanun Pronsane; Kiadtisak Saengrit; Thawatchai Sirisilanan; Weerasak Srisamoot	Beach Woodball	Men's Stroke Team	1 Oct 2016
Gold	Palida Kangkeeree; Siriwan Kangkeeree; Klissana Khaodee; Siripanadda Kuemram; Thanchanok Sareepan; Autchara Thongnim	Beach Woodball	Women's Stroke Team	1 Oct 2016
Gold	Pornteb Poolkaew	Pencak Silat	Men's Tanding 60–65 kg	1 Oct 2016
Gold	Firdao Duromae	Pencak Silat	Women's Tanding 45–50 kg	1 Oct 2016
Gold	Suda Lueangaphichatkun	Pencak Silat	Women's Tanding 50–55 kg	1 Oct 2016
Gold	Phakpong Dejaroen; Uthen Kukheaw; Wannimit Promdee; Thinnagon Phanted; Alongkon Raoklang; Tanusard Ravirod; Aphisak Sarachon; Sornpithak Sriring; Komkid Suapimpa; Seksan Tubtong; Yotsawat Uthaijaronsri; Jackrit Wijara	Beach Sepaktakraw	Men's Team	2 Oct 2016
Gold	Varapatsorn Radarong; Tanarattha Udomchavee	Beach Volleyball	Women's Team	2 Oct 2016
Silver	Nutchanon Kongpolprom	Beach Woodball	Men's Fairway Single	25 Sep 2016
Silver	Suphawadee Kaeosrasaen; Kunsatri Kumsroi	Ju-Jitsu	Women's Show System (Duo)	25 Sep 2016
Silver	Suwanan Boonsorn	Ju-Jitsu	Women's Newaza -45 kg	25 Sep 2016
Silver	Wittaya Songmueang; Worachet Janthasan	Beach Woodball	Men's Fairway Double	26 Sep 2016
Silver	Anatthaon Tiangaun; Amorntip Kangkeeree	Beach Woodball	Women's Fairway Double	26 Sep 2016
Silver	Siramol Deepudsa	Ju-Jitsu	Women's Newaza -55 kg	26 Sep 2016
Silver	Nitiyakorn Srisalai	Muay Thai	Women's Flyweight 48–51 kg	26 Sep 2016
Silver	Chenchira Wankhruea	Muay Thai	Women's Lightweight 57–60 kg	26 Sep 2016
Silver	Khanrutai Pakdee	Beach Athletics	Women's 60m	27 Sep 2016
Silver	Tanatporn Srijan; Thanwarat Chongmi; Krittaya Kwangkunthot; Siwita Pongmak; Jeerawan Namchiangtai; Yamonporn Arunrat	Beach Kabaddi	Women's Team	27 Sep 2016
Silver	Masaya Duangsri; Sorrasak Thaosiri	Beach Shuttlecock	Mixed Doubles	27 Sep 2016
Silver	Kiadtisak Saengrit; Siripanadda Kuemram	Beach Woodball	Mixed Fairway Double	27 Sep 2016
Silver	Tippaporn Pitukpaothai	Beach Rowing	Women's Solo (CM1x)	28 Sep 2016
Silver	Praphan Mainoi	Beach Shuttlecock	Men's Singles	28 Sep 2016
Silver	Pratchaya Tepparak	Beach Athletics	Men's Triple Jump	29 Sep 2016
Silver	Tanaphon Assawawongcharoen; Natthaya Thanaronnawat; Woraphan Nuanlsri; Kamonporn Yaemsee; Suneeka Prichaprong	Beach Athletics	Women's Cross Country Team	29 Sep 2016
Silver	Thidaporn Maihom; Penphan Yothanan; Naruemol Banmoo; Pattrawadee Janthabut	Beach Basketball	Women's Team	29 Sep 2016
Silver	Chanon Patan; Suksan Piachan; Thanakorn Sangkaew; Supan Thongphoo	Beach Petanque	Men's Triple	30 Sep 2016
Silver	Nantawan Fueangsanit; Kanlayanee Lachiangkhong; Aumpawan Suwannaphruk; Nattaya Yoothong	Beach Petanque	Women's Triple	30 Sep 2016
Silver	Sasiwimol Janthasit; Fueangfa Praphatsarang; Wanwisa Jankaen; Payom Srihongsa; Kaewjai Pumsawangkaew; Masaya Duangsri	Beach Shuttlecock	Women's Team	30 Sep 2016
Silver	Titapa Junsookplung	Beach Sambo	Women's -64 kg	1 Oct 2016
Silver	Sabidee Salaeh	Pencak Silat	Men's Tanding 45–50 kg	1 Oct 2016
Silver	Jetsada Cheenkurd	Beach Woodball	Men's Stroke Single	2 Oct 2016
Silver	Chanwit Aunjai	Beach Wrestling	Men's -80 kg	2 Oct 2016
Bronze	Parichat Wannapakdee	Beach Kurash	Women's -48 kg	25 Sep 2016
Bronze	Sarawut Petsing	Ju-Jitsu	Men's Newaza -62 kg	25 Sep 2016
Bronze	Prawit Chilnak	Muay Thai	Men's Lightweight 57–60 kg	25 Sep 2016
Bronze	Areerat Intadis	Beach Athletics	Women's Shot Put	26 Sep 2016
Bronze	Sittichai Klincharoen; Uraiwan Hiranwong	Beach Petanque	Mixed Double	26 Sep 2016
Bronze	Komkrissada Chumkhotr; Sorrasak Thaosiri	Beach Shuttlecock	Men's Doubles	26 Sep 2016
Bronze	Sasiwimol Janthasit; Masaya Duangsri	Beach Shuttlecock	Women's Doubles	26 Sep 2016
Bronze	Jirayut Wuttiwannaphong; Jirayu Vongsawan	Ju-Jitsu	Men's Show System (Duo)	26 Sep 2016
Bronze	Payoongsak Singchalad	Ju-Jitsu	Men's Newaza -56 kg	26 Sep 2016
Bronze	Orapa Senatham	Ju-Jitsu	Women's Newaza -62 kg	26 Sep 2016
Bronze	Onanong Sangsirichok	Ju-Jitsu	Women's Newaza -70 kg	26 Sep 2016
Bronze	Promrob Juntima	Beach Athletics	Men's Shot Put	27 Sep 2016
Bronze	Penpaka Sarasan	Beach Kurash	Women's -70 kg	27 Sep 2016
Bronze	Sonthung Wattanachai	Beach Petanque	Men's Shooting	27 Sep 2016
Bronze	Adisak Jehna; Beela Nawae	Pencak Silat	Men's Ganda	27 Sep 2016
Bronze	Parinya Chuaimaroeng	Beach Athletics	Women's Triple Jump	28 Sep 2016
Bronze	Sirigorn Khodkit	Beach Bodybuilding	Men's -165 cm	28 Sep 2016
Bronze	Sasiwimol Janthasit	Beach Shuttlecock	Women's Singles	28 Sep 2016
Bronze	Thanchanok Sareepan; Autchara Thongnim; Klissana Khaodee; Siripanadda Kuemram	Beach Woodball	Women's Fairway Team	28 Sep 2016
Bronze	Salini Mamu; Supaphon Simthiam; Pimchanok Yingyam	Pencak Silat	Women's Regu	28 Sep 2016
Bronze	Boonthung Srisung; Sanchai Namkhet; Nattawut Innum; Tanaton Graiyarat; Yothin Yaprajan	Beach Athletics	Men's Cross Country Team	29 Sep 2016
Bronze	Sitthakarn Paisanwan; Somporn Mueangkhot	Beach Rowing	Men's Double Sculls (CM2x)	29 Sep 2016
Bronze	Khomkrit Poksanthia; Praphan Mainoi; Panapong Khajornfung; Wichan Temkort; Komkrissada Chumkhotr; Sorrasak Thaosiri	Beach Shuttlecock	Men's Team	30 Sep 2016
Bronze	Orasa Sookdongyor	Beach Wrestling	Women's -50 kg	30 Sep 2016
Bronze	Salinee Srisombat	Beach Wrestling	Women's -70 kg	30 Sep 2016
Bronze	Nanthachai Khansakhon	Pencak Silat	Men's Tanding 50–55 kg	30 Sep 2016
Bronze	Kuibrohem Kubaha	Pencak Silat	Men's Tanding 65–70 kg	30 Sep 2016
Bronze	Supattra Nanong	Beach Sambo	Women's -72 kg	1 Oct 2016
Bronze	Komchan Ngamthaweesuk	Beach Wrestling	Women's -60 kg	1 Oct 2016
Bronze	Nutthawat Suknaisith; Pakakan Thongkot; Kawinthida Janjit; Jaraen Ananuah; Van Wannaphan; Kwanruedi Srithamma; Punpana Manmai; Pawinee Bunjarern; Vanpen Sila; Viyada Surason; Pornpiroon Chalachai; Supharat Sukjan; Orrathai Wongnara; Supagit Jantri	Beach handball	Women's Team	2 Oct 2016
