= Asian championships in sailing =

The Asian championships in sailing are a series of sailing championships in Asia organized by the Asian Sailing Federation.

== List of championships ==
=== ASF championships ===
Championship	Event	Held	Current holder	Editions	Ref
Asian Sailing Championship	Men/Women/Boys/Girls		Champions in six disciplines	17 (2016)	

=== Class championships ===
==== Centreboard classes ====
Class	Championship	Event	Held	Current holder	Editions	Ref
49er	49er & 49er FX Asian Championships	Men				
49er FX	49er & 49er FX Asian Championships	Women				

==== Multihull classes ====
Class	Championship	Event	Held	Current holder	Editions	Ref
Nacra 17	Nacra 17 Asian Championship	Mixed		(Italy) Tita & Banti (2017)		

==== Board classes ====
Class	Championship	Event	Held	Current holder	Editions	Ref
RS:X	RS:X Asian Championships	Men		(South Korea) Lee Tae-hoon (2017)		
RS:X	RS:X Asian Championships	Women		(Hong Kong) Hei Man Chan (2017)		
