= Lee Tae-hoon (windsurfer) =

South Korean windsurfer

Personal information
- Nationality: South Korean
- Born: 18 May 1986 (age 40) Geoje, South Korea
- Height: 180 cm (5 ft 11 in)
- Weight: 72 kg (159 lb)

Korean name
- Hangul: 이태훈
- RR: I Taehun
- MR: I T'aehun

Sailing career
- Sport: Sailing
- Class(es): RS:X, IQFOiL, Mistral
Medal record
Men's sailing
Representing South Korea
Asian Games
Bronze medal – third place	2018 Jakarta	RS:X
Silver medal – second place	2022 Hangzhou	iQFoil
RS:X Asian Championships
Gold medal – first place	2017	RS:X
Summer Universiade
Gold medal – first place	2011 Shenzhen	Sailboard

Lee Tae-hoon (Korean: 이태훈, also known as Lee Tae-hun, born 18 May 1986) is a South Korean windsurfer. He competed at the 2008, 2012 and 2016 Olympics in the RS:X.

== Results ==
Year	Competition	Venue	Position	Event
2008	Olympic Games	(China) Beijing	18th	2008 Olympics - RS:X
2012	Olympic Games	(United Kingdom) London	15th	2012 Olympics - RS:X
