= Tajikistan at the 2016 Asian Beach Games =

- IOC code: TJK
- NOC: National Olympic Committee of the Republic of Tajikistan

in Đà Nẵng
- Medals Ranked 35th: Gold 0 Silver 0 Bronze 0 Total 0

Asian Beach Games appearances
- 2008; 2010; 2012; 2014; 2016

Tajikistan competed at the 2016 Asian Beach Games held in Danang, Vietnam from 24 September to 3 October 2016. It did not win any medals.

== Competitors ==
Sport	Men	Women	Total
Muay	6	0	6
Total	6	0	6
