= Bi Kun =

Chinese windsurfer (born 1995)

Personal information
- Nationality: Chinese
- Born: 12 November 1995 (age 30) Jinzhou, China

Sailing career
- Sport: Sailing
- Class(es): RS:X, IQFOiL
Medal record
Men's sailing
Representing China
Olympic Games
Bronze medal – third place	2020 Tokyo	RS:X
Asian Games
Gold medal – first place	2022 Hangzhou	RS:X
Gold medal – first place	2018 Jakarta	RS:X

Bi Kun (Chinese: 毕焜, born 12 November 1995) is a Chinese professional windsurfer. He represented China at the 2020 Summer Olympics in Tokyo, Japan where he won a bronze medal. He has also won two gold medals at the Asian Games.

== Early life ==
Bi Kun was born on 12 November 1995 in Jinzhou, Liaoning province, China.

== Career ==
Bi Kun took part in his first World Sailing event in October 2014 at the ISAF Sailing World Cup in Qingdao, Shandong, China. He finished fifth in the men's RS:X.

At the 2018 Asian Games in Jakarta, Indonesia, Bi Kun won the men's RS:X to claim his first gold medal.

He made his Olympic debut three years later at the delayed 2020 Summer Olympics in Tokyo, Japan. He was one of three athletes from Hainan selected to compete at the games. The sailing events took place at Sagami Bay in Honshu from 25 July to 4 August 2021. The 13 races in the men's RS:X took place on 25, 26, 28, 29 and 31 July 2021. He started slowly, finishing seventh, ninth and 16th in the first three races. A fourth-place finish in race four was followed by a 13th-place finish and a disqualification in races five and six respectively. He hauled himself up the standings after finishing first, third and second in races seven, eight and nine respectively. Bi Kun ensured his place in the medal race by continuing that form finishing fourth, second and sixth in races 10, 11 and 12 respectively. Despite his slow start to the competition, he still had an outside chance of a medal. In the medal race, he capitalised on mistakes from Piotr Myszka of Poland and Mattia Camboni of Italy and finished the race fourth. As a result, Bi Kun finished third overall and won the bronze medal.

At the 2022 Asian Games in Hangzhou, China, a year later, Bi Kun won the men's RS:X to claim his second gold medal.
