= 49er & 49er FX Asian Championships =

49er & 49er FX Asian Championships are annual Asian Championship sailing regattas in the 49er and the 49er FX classes organised by the International 49er Class Association.

== Editions ==
Year	City	Country	Dates	Events	Athletes	Nations	Notes
2018	Jakarta	Indonesia	18-24 June	2			
2016	Abu Dhabi	United Arab Emirates	7–12 March	2	part of the 2016 Asian Sailing Championship		

Championships	Gold	Silver	Bronze	Notes
2018 Jakarta	India, (IND) GANAPATHY KELAPANDA CHENGAPA, VARUN ASHOK THAKKAR	Thailand, (THA), DON WHICRAFT, DYLAN WHITCRAFT	Japan, (JPN) SHINGEN FURUYA, SHINJI HACHIYAMA	
2016 Abu Dhabi				
