= Beach handball at the 2016 Asian Beach Games =

Sports competition

- Venue: Mỹ Khê Beach
- Dates: 25 September – 2 October 2016

Beach handball competition at the 2016 Asian Beach Games was held in Da Nang, Vietnam from 25 September to 2 October 2016 at My Khe Beach.

== Medalists ==
Event	Gold	Silver	Bronze
Men	Qatar; Ali Garba; Ahmed Morgan; Ahmed Abdelhak; Anis Zouaoui; Mohamed Hassan; Amir Denguir; Mohab Mahfouz; Mutasem Mohamed; Sid Kenaoui; Hani Kakhi	Oman; Ashraf Al-Hadidi; Hussain Al-Jabri; Marwan Al-Dughaishi; Yasir Al-Harthi; Mehdi Al-Suleimani; Said Al-Hasani; Azan Al-Azan; Nasr Al-Tamtami; Usama Al-Kasbi; Asad Al-Hasani	Pakistan; Tahir Ali; Hazrat Hussain; Asim Saeed; Abid Ullah; Muhammad Shahid Pervaiz; Asif Ali; Rana Waqar Khan; Khawar Yasin; Muhammad Uzair Atif; Muzamal Hussain
Women	Vietnam; Nguyễn Thanh Huyền; Lư Ngọc Trinh; Châu Ngọc Thùy Dung; Lê Thị Thanh Phụng; Nguyễn Kim Oanh; Hà Thị Hạnh; Đàm Thị Thanh Huyền; Nguyễn Thị Kim Thư; Trần Thị Sen; Nguyễn Thị Trà My	China; Si Yan; Shen Ping; Han Xinru; Zhang Tianjie; Du Jijuan; Dong Dandi; Zhou Ting; Li Yao; Liu Zhiyue; An Xin	Thailand; Pakakan Thongkot; Pawinee Bunjarern; Vanpen Sila; Viyada Surason; Supharat Sukjan; Punpana Manmai; Kwanruedi Srithamma; Orrathai Wongnara; Kawinthida Janjit; Pornpiroon Chalachai

== Medal table ==
Rank	Nation	Gold	Silver	Bronze	Total
1	Qatar (QAT)	1	0	0	1
1	Vietnam (VIE)	1	0	0	1
3	China (CHN)	0	1	0	1
3	Oman (OMA)	0	1	0	1
5	Pakistan (PAK)	0	0	1	1
5	Thailand (THA)	0	0	1	1
Totals (6 entries)		2	2	2	6

== Results ==
=== Men ===
==== Preliminary ====
===== Group A =====
Pos	Team	Pld	W	L	SF	SA	SD	Pts
1	Qatar	4	4	0	8	1	+7	8
2	Pakistan	4	3	1	6	3	+3	6
3	Bahrain	4	2	2	6	5	+1	4
4	Thailand	4	1	3	3	6	−3	2
5	India	4	0	4	0	8	−8	0

Source: OCA

Date	Time		Score		Period 1	Period 2	SO
25 Sep	10:00	Bahrain	2–1	Thailand	17–14	12–20	7–4
25 Sep	16:00	Pakistan	2–0	India	27–16	20–19	
26 Sep	10:00	India	0–2	Qatar	14–31	15–32	
26 Sep	16:00	Pakistan	2–1	Bahrain	18–19	21–16	9–6
27 Sep	10:45	Bahrain	2–0	India	28–18	17–14	
27 Sep	16:45	Qatar	2–0	Thailand	23–15	17–14	
28 Sep	10:00	Thailand	0–2	Pakistan	20–24	14–26	
28 Sep	16:00	Bahrain	1–2	Qatar	17–16	18–22	6–9
29 Sep	10:00	Thailand	2–0	India	29–24	26–18	
29 Sep	16:00	Qatar	2–0	Pakistan	14–11	19–12	

===== Group B =====
Pos	Team	Pld	W	L	SF	SA	SD	Pts
1	Oman	5	5	0	10	0	+10	10
2	Vietnam	5	3	2	7	5	+2	6
3	Japan	5	3	2	7	5	+2	6
4	Hong Kong	5	3	2	6	5	+1	6
5	Sri Lanka	5	1	4	3	8	−5	2
6	Afghanistan	5	0	5	0	10	−10	0

Source: OCA

Date	Time		Score		Period 1	Period 2	SO
25 Sep	10:45	Japan	1–2	Hong Kong	17–12	11–17	4–5
25 Sep	16:45	Oman	2–0	Sri Lanka	18–11	21–10	
25 Sep	17:30	Vietnam	2–0	Afghanistan	32–17	19–8	
26 Sep	10:45	Hong Kong	2–0	Afghanistan	19–9	22–14	
26 Sep	11:30	Sri Lanka	1–2	Vietnam	14–25	17–16	6–8
26 Sep	16:45	Oman	2–0	Japan	25–14	26–7	
27 Sep	10:00	Japan	2–0	Sri Lanka	18–16	16–15	
27 Sep	10:45	Afghanistan	0–2	Oman	10–26	9–34	
27 Sep	17:30	Vietnam	2–0	Hong Kong	21–13	22–20	
28 Sep	10:45	Hong Kong	0–2	Oman	11–22	7–25	
28 Sep	16:00	Sri Lanka	2–0	Afghanistan	20–19	17–11	
28 Sep	17:30	Japan	2–1	Vietnam	18–19	25–22	7–6
29 Sep	10:00	Afghanistan	0–2	Japan	19–24	17–20	
29 Sep	16:00	Hong Kong	2–0	Sri Lanka	18–17	25–22	
29 Sep	17:30	Vietnam	0–2	Oman	15–16	12–16	

==== Classification 9th–11th ====
Classification 9th–11th
30 September
India	1
Afghanistan	2

Classification 9th–10th
1 October
Afghanistan	0
Sri Lanka	2

===== Semifinals =====
Date	Time		Score		Period 1	Period 2	SO
30 Sep	16:00	India	1–2	Afghanistan	21–19	20–23	8–10

===== Classification 9th–10th =====
Date	Time		Score		Period 1	Period 2	SO
01 Oct	10:45	Afghanistan	0–2	Sri Lanka	11–26	15–22	

==== Classification 5th–8th ====
Classification 5th–8th
30 September
Bahrain	2
Hong Kong	0
30 September
Japan	2
Thailand	1

Classification 5th–6th
1 October
Bahrain	2
Japan	0
Classification 7th–8th
1 October
Hong Kong	0
Thailand	2

===== Semifinals =====
Date	Time		Score		Period 1	Period 2	SO
30 Sep	16:45	Bahrain	2–0	Hong Kong	26–18	16–6	
30 Sep	17:30	Japan	2–1	Thailand	18–24	23–22	7–3

===== Classification 7th–8th =====
Date	Time		Score		Period 1	Period 2	SO
01 Oct	11:30	Hong Kong	0–2	Thailand	13–25	17–29	

===== Classification 5th–6th =====
Date	Time		Score		Period 1	Period 2	SO
01 Oct	16:00	Bahrain	2–0	Japan	20–18	13–12	

==== Final round ====
Semifinals
1 October
Qatar	2
Vietnam	0
1 October
Oman	2
Pakistan	1

Gold medal match
2 October
Qatar	2
Oman	1
Bronze medal match
2 October
Vietnam	1
Pakistan	2

===== Semifinals =====
Date	Time		Score		Period 1	Period 2	SO
01 Oct	15:45	Qatar	2–0	Vietnam	20–10	24–18	
01 Oct	17:15	Oman	2–1	Pakistan	22–21	16–19	7–4

===== Bronze medal match =====
Date	Time		Score		Period 1	Period 2	SO
02 Oct	15:45	Vietnam	1–2	Pakistan	24–20	17–20	8–10

===== Gold medal match =====
Date	Time		Score		Period 1	Period 2	SO
02 Oct	17:15	Qatar	2–1	Oman	23–22	22–24	6–2

=== Women ===
==== Preliminary ====
===== Group A =====
Pos	Team	Pld	W	L	SF	SA	SD	Pts
1	Vietnam	3	3	0	6	1	+5	6
2	Chinese Taipei	3	2	1	5	2	+3	4
3	Jordan	3	1	2	2	4	−2	2
4	Hong Kong	3	0	3	0	6	−6	0

Source: OCA

Date	Time		Score		Period 1	Period 2	SO
25 Sep	16:45	Jordan	0–2	Chinese Taipei	15–20	7–20	
26 Sep	10:00	Hong Kong	0–2	Chinese Taipei	16–17	18–19	
26 Sep	17:30	Jordan	0–2	Vietnam	6–20	16–19	
27 Sep	16:00	Jordan	2–0	Hong Kong	17–16	12–10	
28 Sep	16:45	Hong Kong	0–2	Vietnam	10–18	10–17	
29 Sep	16:45	Vietnam	2–1	Chinese Taipei	23–12	18–20	7–4

===== Group B =====
Pos	Team	Pld	W	L	SF	SA	SD	Pts
1	China	4	4	0	8	1	+7	8
2	Thailand	4	3	1	7	2	+5	6
3	Japan	4	2	2	4	4	0	4
4	India	4	1	3	2	7	−5	2
5	Bangladesh	4	0	4	1	8	−7	0

Source: OCA

Date	Time		Score		Period 1	Period 2	SO
25 Sep	10:45	Bangladesh	0–2	Thailand	8–22	10–19	
25 Sep	16:00	India	0–2	China	12–25	5–16	
26 Sep	10:45	Japan	0–2	China	9–11	16–22	
26 Sep	16:00	India	0–2	Thailand	11–30	9–18	
27 Sep	16:00	China	2–0	Bangladesh	18–6	19–13	
27 Sep	16:45	India	0–2	Japan	5–18	12–15	
28 Sep	10:45	Japan	0–2	Thailand	12–19	13–18	
28 Sep	16:45	Bangladesh	1–2	India	16–12	8–17	4–7
29 Sep	15:15	Thailand	1–2	China	16–13	14–15	6–7
29 Sep	16:45	Bangladesh	0–2	Japan	5–21	6–24	

==== Classification 5th–8th ====
Classification 5th–8th
30 September
Jordan	2
India	0
30 September
Japan	0
Hong Kong	2

Classification 5th–6th
1 October
Jordan	2
Hong Kong	0
Classification 7th–8th
1 October
India	0
Japan	2

===== Semifinals =====
Date	Time		Score		Period 1	Period 2	SO
30 Sep	16:00	Jordan	2–0	India	13–12	17–16	
30 Sep	16:45	Japan	0–2	Hong Kong	14–19	16–23	

===== Classification 7th–8th =====
Date	Time		Score		Period 1	Period 2	SO
01 Oct	10:45	India	0–2	Japan	16–24	9–20	

===== Classification 5th–6th =====
Date	Time		Score		Period 1	Period 2	SO
01 Oct	11:30	Jordan	2–0	Hong Kong	10–8	11–10	

==== Final round ====
Semifinals
1 October
Vietnam	2
Thailand	0
1 October
China	2
Chinese Taipei	0

Gold medal match
2 October
Vietnam	2
China	1
Bronze medal match
2 October
Thailand	2
Chinese Taipei	0

===== Semifinals =====
Date	Time		Score		Period 1	Period 2	SO
01 Oct	15:00	Vietnam	2–0	Thailand	17–13	22–20	
01 Oct	16:30	China	2–0	Chinese Taipei	23–20	22–15	

===== Bronze medal match =====
Date	Time		Score		Period 1	Period 2	SO
02 Oct	15:00	Thailand	2–0	Chinese Taipei	24–23	21–11	

===== Gold medal match =====
Date	Time		Score		Period 1	Period 2	SO
02 Oct	16:30	Vietnam	2–1	China	20–13	16–17	7–6
