= Japan at the 2016 Asian Beach Games =

- IOC code: JPN
- NOC: Japanese Olympic Committee
- Website: https://www.joc.or.jp

in Danang, Vietnam September 24 – October 5
- Competitors: 54 in 7 sports
- Medals Ranked 25th: Gold 1 Silver 2 Bronze 7 Total 10

Asian Beach Games appearances
- 2008; 2010; 2012; 2014; 2016; 2026

Japan competed in the 2016 Asian Beach Games in Danang, Vietnam from September 24 to October 5, 2016. The delegation was bannered by 54 athletes. Japan send their representatives in 7 sports including beach soccer, beach volleyball, beach handball, beach wrestling, vovinam, pétanque, and bodybuilding.

The Japanese beach soccer team won the gold medal, being the Japanese team's only gold medal in this game. Bodybuilding took home one silver and two bronze medals, followed by beach sambo which won one silver and one bronze. Beach wrestling won two bronze medals, while pétanque and vovinam bagged one bronze medal each.

== Medalists ==
Medal	Name	Sport	Event	Date
Gold	Shingo Terukina; Yusuke Kawai; Shotaro Haraguchi; Yuki Nakahara; Naoya Matsuo; Teruki Tabata; Takaaki Oba; Takuya Akaguma; Takasuke Goto; Ozu Moreira	Beach soccer	Tournaments	October 2
Silver	Takahiro Mizoguchi	Bodybuilding	Men's 158 cm	September 27
Silver	Haruka Murase	Beach sambo	Men's 74 kg	October 2
Bronze	Ayumi Goma	Pétanque	Women's singles	September 28
Bronze	Hiroaki Inoue	Bodybuilding	Men's 172 cm	September 28
Bronze	Shunsuke Taguchi	Bodybuilding	Men's 180 cm	September 28
Bronze	Hikaru Aono	Beach wrestling	Women's 50 kg	September 30
Bronze	Miku Saito	Beach wrestling	Women's +70 kg	October 1
Bronze	Takehiro Yamashita	Beach sambo	Men's 74 kg	October 1
Bronze	Yoshimi Sadamatsu	Vovinam	Dragon tiger form	October 1

Medals by sport
Sport	1st place, gold medalist(s)	2nd place, silver medalist(s)	3rd place, bronze medalist(s)	Total
Beach soccer	1	0	0	1
Bodybuilding	0	1	2	3
Beach sambo	0	1	1	2
Beach wrestling	0	0	2	2
Pétanque	0	0	1	1
Vovinam	0	0	1	1
Total	1	2	7	10

== Competitors ==
The following is the list of number of competitors participating in the Games.

Sport	Men	Women	Total
Bodybuilding	3	0	3
Beach handball	10	10	20
Beach sambo	4	1	5
Beach soccer	10	0	10
Beach volleyball	2	2	4
Beach wrestling	1	2	3
Pétanque	4	4	8
Vovinam	0	1	1
Total	34	20	54

== Beach soccer ==
=== Result ===
Team	Event	Group stage			Quarter-finals	Semi-finals	Gold medal match	
Team	Event	Opposition Score	Opposition Score	Rank	Opposition Score	Opposition Score	Opposition Score	Rank
Japan men's	Men's tournament	(Afghanistan) Afghanistan; W 11–0	(China) China; W 7–2	1 Q	(United Arab Emirates) UAE; W 6–2	(Lebanon) Lebanon; W 6–5	(Oman) Oman; W 4–3	1st place, gold medalist(s)

=== Team ===
(Japan) Shingo Terukina
(Japan) Yusuke Kawai
(Japan) Shotaro Haraguchi
(Japan) Yuki Nakahara
(Japan) Naoya Matsuo
(Japan) Teruki Tabata
(Japan) Takaaki Oba
(Japan) Takuya Akaguma
(Japan) Takasuke Goto
(Japan) Ozu Moreira

== Beach volleyball ==
=== Men's tournament ===
Team	Event	Group stage			Quarter-finals	Semi-finals	Gold medal match	
Team	Event	Opposition Score	Opposition Score	Rank	Opposition Score	Opposition Score	Opposition Score	Rank
Masato Kurasaka; Momota Shimada	Men's tournament	(Oman) Al-Shereiqi/Al-Housni; L 13–21, 13-21	(Thailand) Sukto/Khaolumtarn; W 21-19, 21-17	3	did not advance			

=== Women's tournament ===
Group Stage

Team	Event	Group stage					
Team	Event	Opposition Score	Opposition Score	Opposition Score	Opposition Score	Opposition Score	Rank
Azusa Futami; Reika Murakami	Women's tournament	(China) Tang/Wang; L 22-20, 13-21, 10-15	(Sri Lanka) Lakmini/ Weerasinghe; W 21–16, 21–13	(Thailand) Numwong/ Naraphornrapat; L 17–21, 8–21	(Philippines) Gorre/Arocha; W 21-13, 21-5	(Vietnam) Tứ/Lê; W 21–16, 18–21, 15–11	3 Q

Knockout Stage

Team	Round of 16	Quarter-finals	Semi-finals	Gold medal match	Rank
Azusa Futami; Reika Murakami	(Indonesia) Ratnasari/Eka; W 19-21, 21-18, 15–8	(Kazakhstan) Mashkova/ Tsimbalova; L 15-21, 14-15	did not advance		

== Pétanque ==
=== Men ===
1. Shooting
Haruki Kato

2. Singles
Takayuki Watabe

3. Doubles
Hiroshi Katata
Yoshihiro Noda

=== Women ===
1. Shooting
Keiko Katata

2. Singles
Ayumi Goma (bronze)

3. Doubles
Akemi Kinoshita
Rieko Ujihara

== Vovinam ==
Athlete	Event	Score	Rank
Yoshimi Sadamatsu	Dragon-tiger form	261	3rd place, bronze medalist(s)
