= Timor-Leste at the 2016 Asian Beach Games =

- IOC code: TLS
- NOC: National Olympic Committee of Timor-Leste

in Đà Nẵng
- Medals Ranked 35th: Gold 0 Silver 0 Bronze 0 Total 0

Asian Beach Games appearances
- 2008; 2010; 2012; 2014; 2016

Timor Leste competed at the 2016 Asian Beach Games held in Danang, Vietnam from 24 September to 3 October 2016. It did not win any medals.

== Competitors ==
| Sport | Men | Women | Total |
|---|---|---|---|
| Beach Volleyball | 2 | 2 | 4 |
| Total | 2 | 2 | 4 |
