= Beach volleyball at the 2016 Asian Beach Games =

- Venue: Mỹ Khê Beach
- Dates: 25 September – 2 October 2016

Beach volleyball competition at the 2016 Asian Beach Games was held in Da Nang, Vietnam from 25 September to 2 October 2016 at Mỹ Khê Beach.

== Medalists ==
| Event | Gold | Silver | Bronze |
|---|---|---|---|
| Men | Qatar; Jefferson Pereira; Cherif Younousse | Qatar; Júlio Nascimento; Ahmed Tijan | Kazakhstan; Dmitriy Yakovlev; Alexey Sidorenko |
| Women | Thailand; Varapatsorn Radarong; Tanarattha Udomchavee | China; Tang Ningya; Wang Xinxin | China; Wang Fan; Xia Xinyi |

== Medal table ==
| Rank | Nation | Gold | Silver | Bronze | Total |
|---|---|---|---|---|---|
| 1 | Qatar (QAT) | 1 | 1 | 0 | 2 |
| 2 | Thailand (THA) | 1 | 0 | 0 | 1 |
| 3 | China (CHN) | 0 | 1 | 1 | 2 |
| 4 | Kazakhstan (KAZ) | 0 | 0 | 1 | 1 |
| Totals (4 entries) | | 2 | 2 | 2 | 6 |

== Results ==
=== Men ===
==== Preliminary ====
===== Pool A =====
| Pos | Team | Pld | W | L | Pts | SW | SL | SR | SPW | SPL | SPR |
|---|---|---|---|---|---|---|---|---|---|---|---|
| 1 | Pereira–Younousse (QAT) | 3 | 3 | 0 | 6 | 6 | 0 | MAX | 127 | 70 | 1.814 |
| 2 | Juan–Wang (TPE) | 3 | 2 | 1 | 5 | 4 | 2 | 2.000 | 116 | 111 | 1.045 |
| 3 | Huỳnh–Nguyễn (VIE) | 3 | 1 | 2 | 4 | 2 | 4 | 0.500 | 111 | 119 | 0.933 |
| 4 | Khan–Moon (PAK) | 3 | 0 | 3 | 3 | 0 | 6 | 0.000 | 72 | 126 | 0.571 |

Source: OCA

| Date | | Score | | Set 1 | Set 2 | Set 3 |
|---|---|---|---|---|---|---|
| 25 Sep | Pereira–Younousse (QAT) | 2–0 | Khan–Moon (PAK) | 21–4 | 21–7 | |
| 25 Sep | Huỳnh–Nguyễn (VIE) | 0–2 | Juan–Wang (TPE) | 24–26 | 13–21 | |
| 26 Sep | Pereira–Younousse (QAT) | 2–0 | Juan–Wang (TPE) | 21–17 | 21–10 | |
| 26 Sep | Khan–Moon (PAK) | 0–2 | Huỳnh–Nguyễn (VIE) | 12–21 | 17–21 | |
| 27 Sep | Pereira–Younousse (QAT) | 2–0 | Huỳnh–Nguyễn (VIE) | 21–12 | 22–20 | |
| 27 Sep | Juan–Wang (TPE) | 2–0 | Khan–Moon (PAK) | 21–16 | 21–16 | |

===== Pool B =====
| Pos | Team | Pld | W | L | Pts | SW | SL | SR | SPW | SPL | SPR |
|---|---|---|---|---|---|---|---|---|---|---|---|
| 1 | Nascimento–Tijan (QAT) | 3 | 3 | 0 | 6 | 6 | 1 | 6.000 | 140 | 95 | 1.474 |
| 2 | Nguyễn–Nguyễn (VIE) | 3 | 2 | 1 | 5 | 5 | 3 | 1.667 | 145 | 140 | 1.036 |
| 3 | Ekanayaka–Kumara (SRI) | 3 | 1 | 2 | 4 | 2 | 5 | 0.400 | 114 | 135 | 0.844 |
| 4 | Raza–Razzaq (PAK) | 3 | 0 | 3 | 3 | 2 | 6 | 0.333 | 118 | 147 | 0.803 |

Source: OCA

| Date | | Score | | Set 1 | Set 2 | Set 3 |
|---|---|---|---|---|---|---|
| 25 Sep | Nascimento–Tijan (QAT) | 2–0 | Raza–Razzaq (PAK) | 21–11 | 21–13 | |
| 25 Sep | Ekanayaka–Kumara (SRI) | 0–2 | Nguyễn–Nguyễn (VIE) | 16–21 | 22–24 | |
| 26 Sep | Nascimento–Tijan (QAT) | 2–1 | Nguyễn–Nguyễn (VIE) | 20–22 | 21–16 | 15–12 |
| 26 Sep | Raza–Razzaq (PAK) | 1–2 | Ekanayaka–Kumara (SRI) | 15–21 | 21–19 | 12–15 |
| 27 Sep | Nascimento–Tijan (QAT) | 2–0 | Ekanayaka–Kumara (SRI) | 21–10 | 21–11 | |
| 27 Sep | Nguyễn–Nguyễn (VIE) | 2–1 | Raza–Razzaq (PAK) | 21–17 | 14–21 | 15–8 |

===== Pool C =====
| Pos | Team | Pld | W | L | Pts | SW | SL | SR | SPW | SPL | SPR |
|---|---|---|---|---|---|---|---|---|---|---|---|
| 1 | Yakovlev–Sidorenko (KAZ) | 3 | 3 | 0 | 6 | 6 | 0 | MAX | 126 | 70 | 1.800 |
| 2 | Al-Subhi–Al-Jalbubi (OMA) | 3 | 2 | 1 | 5 | 4 | 2 | 2.000 | 110 | 96 | 1.146 |
| 3 | Zardan–Sediqi (AFG) | 3 | 1 | 2 | 4 | 2 | 4 | 0.500 | 88 | 108 | 0.815 |
| 4 | Davaajargal–Sainbileg (MGL) | 3 | 0 | 3 | 3 | 0 | 6 | 0.000 | 76 | 126 | 0.603 |

Source: OCA

| Date | | Score | | Set 1 | Set 2 | Set 3 |
|---|---|---|---|---|---|---|
| 25 Sep | Yakovlev–Sidorenko (KAZ) | 2–0 | Zardan–Sediqi (AFG) | 21–7 | 21–13 | |
| 25 Sep | Al-Subhi–Al-Jalbubi (OMA) | 2–0 | Davaajargal–Sainbileg (MGL) | 21–10 | 21–18 | |
| 26 Sep | Yakovlev–Sidorenko (KAZ) | 2–0 | Davaajargal–Sainbileg (MGL) | 21–9 | 21–15 | |
| 26 Sep | Zardan–Sediqi (AFG) | 0–2 | Al-Subhi–Al-Jalbubi (OMA) | 14–21 | 12–21 | |
| 27 Sep | Yakovlev–Sidorenko (KAZ) | 2–0 | Al-Subhi–Al-Jalbubi (OMA) | 21–9 | 21–17 | |
| 27 Sep | Davaajargal–Sainbileg (MGL) | 0–2 | Zardan–Sediqi (AFG) | 9–21 | 15–21 | |

===== Pool D =====
| Pos | Team | Pld | W | L | Pts | SW | SL | SR | SPW | SPL | SPR |
|---|---|---|---|---|---|---|---|---|---|---|---|
| 1 | Inkiew–Padsawud (THA) | 3 | 3 | 0 | 6 | 6 | 2 | 3.000 | 155 | 129 | 1.202 |
| 2 | Abuduhalikejiang–Li (CHN) | 3 | 2 | 1 | 5 | 5 | 2 | 2.500 | 144 | 114 | 1.263 |
| 3 | Mohammad–Ebrahimi (AFG) | 3 | 1 | 2 | 4 | 2 | 4 | 0.500 | 89 | 120 | 0.742 |
| 4 | Sim–Chuk (CAM) | 3 | 0 | 3 | 3 | 1 | 6 | 0.167 | 113 | 138 | 0.819 |

Source: OCA

| Date | | Score | | Set 1 | Set 2 | Set 3 |
|---|---|---|---|---|---|---|
| 25 Sep | Abuduhalikejiang–Li (CHN) | 2–0 | Mohammad–Ebrahimi (AFG) | 21–13 | 21–12 | |
| 25 Sep | Inkiew–Padsawud (THA) | 2–1 | Sim–Chuk (CAM) | 18–21 | 21–17 | 15–9 |
| 26 Sep | Abuduhalikejiang–Li (CHN) | 2–0 | Sim–Chuk (CAM) | 21–14 | 21–16 | |
| 26 Sep | Mohammad–Ebrahimi (AFG) | 0–2 | Inkiew–Padsawud (THA) | 11–21 | 11–21 | |
| 27 Sep | Abuduhalikejiang–Li (CHN) | 1–2 | Inkiew–Padsawud (THA) | 27–29 | 21–15 | 12–15 |
| 27 Sep | Sim–Chuk (CAM) | 0–2 | Mohammad–Ebrahimi (AFG) | 17–21 | 19–21 | |

===== Pool E =====
| Pos | Team | Pld | W | L | Pts | SW | SL | SR | SPW | SPL | SPR |
|---|---|---|---|---|---|---|---|---|---|---|---|
| 1 | Rachmawan–Ramadhan (INA) | 3 | 3 | 0 | 6 | 6 | 0 | MAX | 126 | 89 | 1.416 |
| 2 | Wong–Lau (HKG) | 3 | 2 | 1 | 5 | 4 | 3 | 1.333 | 128 | 120 | 1.067 |
| 3 | Tiron–Madusanka (SRI) | 3 | 1 | 2 | 4 | 3 | 4 | 0.750 | 121 | 116 | 1.043 |
| 4 | Lee–Choi (KOR) | 3 | 0 | 3 | 3 | 0 | 6 | 0.000 | 76 | 126 | 0.603 |

Source: OCA

| Date | | Score | | Set 1 | Set 2 | Set 3 |
|---|---|---|---|---|---|---|
| 25 Sep | Rachmawan–Ramadhan (INA) | 2–0 | Tiron–Madusanka (SRI) | 21–15 | 21–19 | |
| 25 Sep | Wong–Lau (HKG) | 2–0 | Lee–Choi (KOR) | 21–17 | 21–16 | |
| 26 Sep | Rachmawan–Ramadhan (INA) | 2–0 | Lee–Choi (KOR) | 21–12 | 21–11 | |
| 26 Sep | Tiron–Madusanka (SRI) | 1–2 | Wong–Lau (HKG) | 21–18 | 19–21 | 5–15 |
| 27 Sep | Rachmawan–Ramadhan (INA) | 2–0 | Wong–Lau (HKG) | 21–18 | 21–14 | |
| 27 Sep | Lee–Choi (KOR) | 0–2 | Tiron–Madusanka (SRI) | 7–21 | 13–21 | |

===== Pool F =====
| Pos | Team | Pld | W | L | Pts | SW | SL | SR | SPW | SPL | SPR |
|---|---|---|---|---|---|---|---|---|---|---|---|
| 1 | Kuleshov–Babichev (KAZ) | 3 | 3 | 0 | 6 | 6 | 0 | MAX | 128 | 88 | 1.455 |
| 2 | Yan–Zhou (CHN) | 3 | 1 | 2 | 4 | 3 | 5 | 0.600 | 140 | 144 | 0.972 |
| 3 | Biswas–Ahmed (BAN) | 3 | 1 | 2 | 4 | 3 | 5 | 0.600 | 137 | 144 | 0.951 |
| 4 | Abdul Hameed–Naseem (MDV) | 3 | 1 | 2 | 4 | 3 | 5 | 0.600 | 115 | 144 | 0.799 |

Source: OCA

| Date | | Score | | Set 1 | Set 2 | Set 3 |
|---|---|---|---|---|---|---|
| 25 Sep | Kuleshov–Babichev (KAZ) | 2–0 | Biswas–Ahmed (BAN) | 21–15 | 21–16 | |
| 25 Sep | Abdul Hameed–Naseem (MDV) | 2–1 | Yan–Zhou (CHN) | 12–21 | 21–16 | 15–11 |
| 26 Sep | Kuleshov–Babichev (KAZ) | 2–0 | Yan–Zhou (CHN) | 23–21 | 21–14 | |
| 26 Sep | Biswas–Ahmed (BAN) | 2–1 | Abdul Hameed–Naseem (MDV) | 18–21 | 21–14 | 15–10 |
| 27 Sep | Kuleshov–Babichev (KAZ) | 2–0 | Abdul Hameed–Naseem (MDV) | 21–10 | 21–12 | |
| 27 Sep | Yan–Zhou (CHN) | 2–1 | Biswas–Ahmed (BAN) | 19–21 | 21–16 | 17–15 |

===== Pool G =====
| Pos | Team | Pld | W | L | Pts | SW | SL | SR | SPW | SPL | SPR |
|---|---|---|---|---|---|---|---|---|---|---|---|
| 1 | Ashfiya–Licardo (INA) | 3 | 3 | 0 | 6 | 6 | 0 | MAX | 126 | 78 | 1.615 |
| 2 | Abi Chedid–El-Azzi (LIB) | 3 | 2 | 1 | 5 | 4 | 2 | 2.000 | 114 | 98 | 1.163 |
| 3 | Abdul Wahid–Naseer (MDV) | 3 | 1 | 2 | 4 | 2 | 4 | 0.500 | 96 | 111 | 0.865 |
| 4 | Mönkhbayar–Bilgüün (MGL) | 3 | 0 | 3 | 3 | 0 | 6 | 0.000 | 77 | 126 | 0.611 |

Source: OCA

| Date | | Score | | Set 1 | Set 2 | Set 3 |
|---|---|---|---|---|---|---|
| 25 Sep | Ashfiya–Licardo (INA) | 2–0 | Abi Chedid–El-Azzi (LIB) | 21–13 | 21–17 | |
| 25 Sep | Abdul Wahid–Naseer (MDV) | 2–0 | Mönkhbayar–Bilgüün (MGL) | 21–13 | 21–14 | |
| 26 Sep | Ashfiya–Licardo (INA) | 2–0 | Mönkhbayar–Bilgüün (MGL) | 21–8 | 21–11 | |
| 26 Sep | Abi Chedid–El-Azzi (LIB) | 2–0 | Abdul Wahid–Naseer (MDV) | 21–9 | 21–16 | |
| 27 Sep | Ashfiya–Licardo (INA) | 2–0 | Abdul Wahid–Naseer (MDV) | 21–19 | 21–10 | |
| 27 Sep | Mönkhbayar–Bilgüün (MGL) | 0–2 | Abi Chedid–El-Azzi (LIB) | 15–21 | 16–21 | |

===== Pool H =====
| Pos | Team | Pld | W | L | Pts | SW | SL | SR | SPW | SPL | SPR |
|---|---|---|---|---|---|---|---|---|---|---|---|
| 1 | Sukto–Khaolumtarn (THA) | 3 | 2 | 1 | 5 | 4 | 2 | 2.000 | 120 | 83 | 1.446 |
| 2 | Al-Shereiqi–Al-Housni (OMA) | 3 | 2 | 1 | 5 | 4 | 2 | 2.000 | 108 | 80 | 1.350 |
| 3 | Kurasaka–Shimada (JPN) | 3 | 2 | 1 | 5 | 4 | 2 | 2.000 | 110 | 105 | 1.048 |
| 4 | Leão–Amaral (TLS) | 3 | 0 | 3 | 3 | 0 | 6 | 0.000 | 56 | 126 | 0.444 |

Source: OCA

| Date | | Score | | Set 1 | Set 2 | Set 3 |
|---|---|---|---|---|---|---|
| 25 Sep | Sukto–Khaolumtarn (THA) | 2–0 | Leão–Amaral (TLS) | 21–10 | 21–7 | |
| 25 Sep | Al-Shereiqi–Al-Housni (OMA) | 2–0 | Kurasaka–Shimada (JPN) | 21–13 | 21–13 | |
| 26 Sep | Sukto–Khaolumtarn (THA) | 0–2 | Kurasaka–Shimada (JPN) | 19–21 | 17–21 | |
| 26 Sep | Leão–Amaral (TLS) | 0–2 | Al-Shereiqi–Al-Housni (OMA) | 3–21 | 9–21 | |
| 27 Sep | Sukto–Khaolumtarn (THA) | 2–0 | Al-Shereiqi–Al-Housni (OMA) | 21–17 | 21–7 | |
| 27 Sep | Kurasaka–Shimada (JPN) | 2–0 | Leão–Amaral (TLS) | 21–15 | 21–12 | |

==== Knockout round ====
Round of 32
| Date | | Score | | Set 1 | Set 2 | Set 3 |
|---|---|---|---|---|---|---|
| 28 Sep | Ekanayaka–Kumara (SRI) | 2–1 | Al-Subhi–Al-Jalbubi (OMA) | 19–21 | 21–15 | 15–13 |
| 28 Sep | Abdul Wahid–Naseer (MDV) | 0–2 | Wong–Lau (HKG) | 22–24 | 14–21 | |
| 28 Sep | Zardan–Sediqi (AFG) | 0–2 | Al-Shereiqi–Al-Housni (OMA) | 11–21 | 17–21 | |
| 28 Sep | Biswas–Ahmed (BAN) | 0–2 | Abi Chedid–El-Azzi (LIB) | 12–21 | 18–21 | |
| 28 Sep | Kurasaka–Shimada (JPN) | 0–2 | Nguyễn–Nguyễn (VIE) | 21–23 | 14–21 | |
| 28 Sep | Huỳnh–Nguyễn (VIE) | 0–2 | Abuduhalikejiang–Li (CHN) | 16–21 | 14–21 | |
| 28 Sep | Mohammad–Ebrahimi (AFG) | 0–2 | Yan–Zhou (CHN) | 8–21 | 13–21 | |
| 28 Sep | Tiron–Madusanka (SRI) | 2–1 | Juan–Wang (TPE) | 21–12 | 14–21 | 17–15 |

Round of 16; 29 September
Pereira–Younousse (QAT) | 21 | 22 | 15
Ekanayaka–Kumara (SRI) | 16 | 24 | 9
Wong–Lau (HKG) | 21 | 12 | 15
Sukto–Khaolumtarn (THA) | 15 | 21 | 12
Rachmawan–Ramadhan (INA) | 21 | 21
Al-Shereiqi–Al-Housni (OMA) | 19 | 14
Abi Chedid–El-Azzi (LIB) | 14 | 12
Inkiew–Padsawud (THA) | 21 | 21
Yakovlev–Sidorenko (KAZ) | 21 | 21
Nguyễn–Nguyễn (VIE) | 14 | 16
Abuduhalikejiang–Li (CHN) | 14 | 21 | 16
Kuleshov–Babichev (KAZ) | 21 | 10 | 14
Ashfiya–Licardo (INA) | 20 | 21 | 15
Yan–Zhou (CHN) | 22 | 13 | 17
Tiron–Madusanka (SRI) | 10 | 15
Nascimento–Tijan (QAT) | 21 | 21

Quarterfinals; 30 September
Pereira–Younousse (QAT) | 21 | 21
Wong–Lau (HKG) | 15 | 15
Rachmawan–Ramadhan (INA) | 18 | 21 | 15
Inkiew–Padsawud (THA) | 21 | 14 | 13
Yakovlev–Sidorenko (KAZ) | 21 | 18 | 15
Abuduhalikejiang–Li (CHN) | 18 | 21 | 12
Yan–Zhou (CHN) | 8 | 16
Nascimento–Tijan (QAT) | 21 | 21

Semifinals; 1 October
Pereira–Younousse (QAT) | 21 | 21
Rachmawan–Ramadhan (INA) | 17 | 15
Yakovlev–Sidorenko (KAZ) | 18 | 17
Nascimento–Tijan (QAT) | 21 | 21

Gold medal match 2 October
Pereira–Younousse (QAT) | 21 | 21
Nascimento–Tijan (QAT) | 14 | 15
Bronze medal match
Rachmawan–Ramadhan (INA) | 11 | 15
Yakovlev–Sidorenko (KAZ) | 21 | 21

=== Women ===
==== Preliminary ====
===== Pool A =====
| Pos | Team | Pld | W | L | Pts | SW | SL | SR | SPW | SPL | SPR |
|---|---|---|---|---|---|---|---|---|---|---|---|
| 1 | Mashkova–Tsimbalova (KAZ) | 4 | 4 | 0 | 8 | 8 | 0 | MAX | 170 | 71 | 2.394 |
| 2 | Wu–Kou (TPE) | 4 | 3 | 1 | 7 | 6 | 2 | 3.000 | 157 | 107 | 1.467 |
| 3 | Ng–Wong (HKG) | 4 | 2 | 2 | 6 | 4 | 4 | 1.000 | 133 | 117 | 1.137 |
| 4 | Saffa–Areesha (MDV) | 4 | 1 | 3 | 5 | 2 | 6 | 0.333 | 79 | 159 | 0.497 |
| 5 | Mendes–da Silva (TLS) | 4 | 0 | 4 | 4 | 0 | 8 | 0.000 | 84 | 169 | 0.497 |

Source: OCA

| Date | | Score | | Set 1 | Set 2 | Set 3 |
|---|---|---|---|---|---|---|
| 25 Sep | Ng–Wong (HKG) | 2–0 | Mendes–da Silva (TLS) | 21–10 | 21–9 | |
| 25 Sep | Wu–Kou (TPE) | 2–0 | Saffa–Areesha (MDV) | 21–6 | 21–6 | |
| 25 Sep | Mashkova–Tsimbalova (KAZ) | 2–0 | Mendes–da Silva (TLS) | 21–3 | 21–5 | |
| 25 Sep | Ng–Wong (HKG) | 0–2 | Wu–Kou (TPE) | 15–21 | 12–21 | |
| 26 Sep | Mashkova–Tsimbalova (KAZ) | 2–0 | Saffa–Areesha (MDV) | 21–4 | 21–6 | |
| 26 Sep | Mendes–da Silva (TLS) | 0–2 | Wu–Kou (TPE) | 11–21 | 13–21 | |
| 27 Sep | Mashkova–Tsimbalova (KAZ) | 2–0 | Wu–Kou (TPE) | 23–21 | 21–10 | |
| 27 Sep | Saffa–Areesha (MDV) | 0–2 | Ng–Wong (HKG) | 8–21 | 6–21 | |
| 28 Sep | Mashkova–Tsimbalova (KAZ) | 2–0 | Ng–Wong (HKG) | 21–9 | 21–13 | |
| 28 Sep | Saffa–Areesha (MDV) | 2–0 | Mendes–da Silva (TLS) | 22–20 | 21–13 | |

===== Pool B =====
| Pos | Team | Pld | W | L | Pts | SW | SL | SR | SPW | SPL | SPR |
|---|---|---|---|---|---|---|---|---|---|---|---|
| 1 | Wang–Xia (CHN) | 4 | 4 | 0 | 8 | 8 | 0 | MAX | 168 | 88 | 1.909 |
| 2 | Ratnasari–Eka (INA) | 4 | 3 | 1 | 7 | 6 | 2 | 3.000 | 156 | 116 | 1.345 |
| 3 | Samalikova–Nikitina (KAZ) | 4 | 2 | 2 | 6 | 4 | 4 | 1.000 | 149 | 133 | 1.120 |
| 4 | Lee–Kim (KOR) | 4 | 1 | 3 | 5 | 2 | 6 | 0.333 | 118 | 153 | 0.771 |
| 5 | Majidha–Rashida (MDV) | 4 | 0 | 4 | 4 | 0 | 8 | 0.000 | 67 | 168 | 0.399 |

Source: OCA

| Date | | Score | | Set 1 | Set 2 | Set 3 |
|---|---|---|---|---|---|---|
| 25 Sep | Ratnasari–Eka (INA) | 2–0 | Lee–Kim (KOR) | 21–11 | 21–14 | |
| 25 Sep | Samalikova–Nikitina (KAZ) | 2–0 | Majidha–Rashida (MDV) | 21–5 | 21–8 | |
| 26 Sep | Wang–Xia (CHN) | 2–0 | Lee–Kim (KOR) | 21–6 | 21–10 | |
| 26 Sep | Ratnasari–Eka (INA) | 2–0 | Samalikova–Nikitina (KAZ) | 22–20 | 21–13 | |
| 26 Sep | Wang–Xia (CHN) | 2–0 | Majidha–Rashida (MDV) | 21–6 | 21–7 | |
| 26 Sep | Lee–Kim (KOR) | 0–2 | Samalikova–Nikitina (KAZ) | 14–21 | 21–23 | |
| 27 Sep | Wang–Xia (CHN) | 2–0 | Samalikova–Nikitina (KAZ) | 21–12 | 21–18 | |
| 27 Sep | Majidha–Rashida (MDV) | 0–2 | Ratnasari–Eka (INA) | 9–21 | 7–21 | |
| 28 Sep | Wang–Xia (CHN) | 2–0 | Ratnasari–Eka (INA) | 21–11 | 21–18 | |
| 28 Sep | Majidha–Rashida (MDV) | 0–2 | Lee–Kim (KOR) | 13–21 | 12–21 | |

===== Pool C =====
| Pos | Team | Pld | W | L | Pts | SW | SL | SR | SPW | SPL | SPR |
|---|---|---|---|---|---|---|---|---|---|---|---|
| 1 | Radarong–Udomchavee (THA) | 4 | 4 | 0 | 8 | 8 | 1 | 8.000 | 180 | 115 | 1.565 |
| 2 | Juliana–Utami (INA) | 4 | 3 | 1 | 7 | 6 | 3 | 2.000 | 167 | 113 | 1.478 |
| 3 | Mai–Nguyễn (VIE) | 4 | 2 | 2 | 6 | 6 | 4 | 1.500 | 170 | 156 | 1.090 |
| 4 | Gunasinghe–Tharuka (SRI) | 4 | 1 | 3 | 5 | 2 | 6 | 0.333 | 110 | 158 | 0.696 |
| 5 | Pun–Upreti (NEP) | 4 | 0 | 4 | 4 | 0 | 8 | 0.000 | 84 | 169 | 0.497 |

Source: OCA

| Date | | Score | | Set 1 | Set 2 | Set 3 |
|---|---|---|---|---|---|---|
| 25 Sep | Juliana–Utami (INA) | 2–0 | Pun–Upreti (NEP) | 21–6 | 21–9 | |
| 25 Sep | Gunasinghe–Tharuka (SRI) | 0–2 | Mai–Nguyễn (VIE) | 16–21 | 11–21 | |
| 26 Sep | Radarong–Udomchavee (THA) | 2–0 | Pun–Upreti (NEP) | 21–10 | 21–5 | |
| 26 Sep | Juliana–Utami (INA) | 2–0 | Gunasinghe–Tharuka (SRI) | 21–6 | 21–7 | |
| 27 Sep | Radarong–Udomchavee (THA) | 2–1 | Mai–Nguyễn (VIE) | 21–14 | 18–21 | 15–8 |
| 27 Sep | Pun–Upreti (NEP) | 0–2 | Gunasinghe–Tharuka (SRI) | 12–21 | 20–22 | |
| 27 Sep | Radarong–Udomchavee (THA) | 2–0 | Gunasinghe–Tharuka (SRI) | 21–14 | 21–13 | |
| 27 Sep | Mai–Nguyễn (VIE) | 1–2 | Juliana–Utami (INA) | 10–21 | 21–17 | 12–15 |
| 28 Sep | Radarong–Udomchavee (THA) | 2–0 | Juliana–Utami (INA) | 21–17 | 21–13 | |
| 28 Sep | Mai–Nguyễn (VIE) | 2–0 | Pun–Upreti (NEP) | 21–14 | 21–8 | |

===== Pool D =====
| Pos | Team | Pld | W | L | Pts | SW | SL | SR | SPW | SPL | SPR |
|---|---|---|---|---|---|---|---|---|---|---|---|
| 1 | Tang–Wang (CHN) | 5 | 5 | 0 | 10 | 10 | 2 | 5.000 | 232 | 156 | 1.487 |
| 2 | Numwong–Hongpak (THA) | 5 | 4 | 1 | 9 | 9 | 2 | 4.500 | 217 | 135 | 1.607 |
| 3 | Futami–Murakami (JPN) | 5 | 3 | 2 | 8 | 7 | 5 | 1.400 | 208 | 193 | 1.078 |
| 4 | Tứ–Lê (VIE) | 5 | 2 | 3 | 7 | 5 | 6 | 0.833 | 179 | 189 | 0.947 |
| 5 | Lakmini–Weerasinghe (SRI) | 5 | 1 | 4 | 6 | 2 | 8 | 0.250 | 139 | 189 | 0.735 |
| 6 | Gorre–Arocha (PHI) | 5 | 0 | 5 | 5 | 0 | 10 | 0.000 | 97 | 210 | 0.462 |

Source: OCA

| Date | | Score | | Set 1 | Set 2 | Set 3 |
|---|---|---|---|---|---|---|
| 25 Sep | Tang–Wang (CHN) | 2–1 | Futami–Murakami (JPN) | 20–22 | 21–13 | 15–10 |
| 25 Sep | Numwong–Hongpak (THA) | 2–0 | Gorre–Arocha (PHI) | 21–8 | 21–11 | |
| 25 Sep | Tứ–Lê (VIE) | 2–0 | Lakmini–Weerasinghe (SRI) | 21–12 | 21–15 | |
| 26 Sep | Tang–Wang (CHN) | 2–0 | Gorre–Arocha (PHI) | 21–7 | 21–8 | |
| 26 Sep | Futami–Murakami (JPN) | 2–0 | Lakmini–Weerasinghe (SRI) | 21–16 | 21–13 | |
| 26 Sep | Numwong–Hongpak (THA) | 0–2 | Tứ–Lê (VIE) | 21–15 | 21–5 | |
| 27 Sep | Tang–Wang (CHN) | 2–0 | Lakmini–Weerasinghe (SRI) | 21–12 | 21–8 | |
| 27 Sep | Gorre–Arocha (PHI) | 0–2 | Tứ–Lê (VIE) | 11–21 | 13–21 | |
| 27 Sep | Futami–Murakami (JPN) | 0–2 | Numwong–Hongpak (THA) | 17–21 | 8–21 | |
| 28 Sep | Tang–Wang (CHN) | 2–0 | Tứ–Lê (VIE) | 21–10 | 21–17 | |
| 28 Sep | Lakmini–Weerasinghe (SRI) | 0–2 | Numwong–Hongpak (THA) | 14–21 | 7–21 | |
| 28 Sep | Gorre–Arocha (PHI) | 0–2 | Futami–Murakami (JPN) | 13–21 | 5–21 | |
| 28 Sep | Tang–Wang (CHN) | 2–1 | Numwong–Hongpak (THA) | 14–21 | 21–15 | 15–13 |
| 28 Sep | Tứ–Lê (VIE) | 1–2 | Futami–Murakami (JPN) | 16–21 | 21–18 | 11–15 |
| 28 Sep | Lakmini–Weerasinghe (SRI) | 2–0 | Gorre–Arocha (PHI) | 21–13 | 21–8 | |

==== Knockout round ====
Round of 16; 29 September
Mashkova–Tsimbalova (KAZ) | 21 | 21
Gunasinghe–Tharuka (SRI) | 10 | 12
Ratnasari–Eka (INA) | 21 | 18 | 8
Futami–Murakami (JPN) | 19 | 21 | 15
Wu–Kou (TPE) | 30 | 21
Mai–Nguyễn (VIE) | 28 | 16
Lee–Kim (KOR) | 8 | 10
Tang–Wang (CHN) | 21 | 21
Radarong–Udomchavee (THA) | 21 | 21
Tứ–Lê (VIE) | 16 | 10
Numwong–Hongpak (THA) | 21 | 21
Samalikova–Nikitina (KAZ) | 12 | 9
Juliana–Utami (INA) | 21 | 21
Ng–Wong (HKG) | 9 | 9
Saffa–Areesha (MDV) | 6 | 4
Wang–Xia (CHN) | 21 | 21

Quarterfinals; 30 September
Mashkova–Tsimbalova (KAZ) | 21 | 21
Futami–Murakami (JPN) | 15 | 14
Wu–Kou (TPE) | 18 | 14
Tang–Wang (CHN) | 21 | 21
Radarong–Udomchavee (THA) | 18
Numwong–Hongpak (THA) | 14^{R}
Juliana–Utami (INA) | 17 | 14
Wang–Xia (CHN) | 21 | 21

Semifinals; 1 October
Mashkova–Tsimbalova (KAZ) | 21 | 19 | 15
Tang–Wang (CHN) | 16 | 21 | 17
Radarong–Udomchavee (THA) | 21 | 24
Wang–Xia (CHN) | 19 | 22

Gold medal match 2 October
Tang–Wang (CHN) | 18 | 15
Radarong–Udomchavee (THA) | 21 | 21
Bronze medal match
Mashkova–Tsimbalova (KAZ) | 18 | 17
Wang–Xia (CHN) | 21 | 21
