= Ayumi Goma =

Japanese pétanque athlete

- Japanese National team player

Personal information
- Born: 21 November tokyo

Sport
- Sport: pétanque bocce

Ayumi Goma (郷間亜由美, Gōma Ayumi) is a Japanese pétanque athlete from Aoyama Pétanque Tokyo as well as a Sport Boules athlete.

She won a bronze medal in the women's singles event at the 2016 Asian Beach Games held in Danang, Vietnam and was the only Japanese medalist in pétanque at the games.

In 2026, she was selected as a member of the Japanese Sport Boules national team and won the gold medal in the women's doubles event at the 2026 Asia Oceania Sport Boules Championships in Myrtleford, Victoria, Australia, representing Japan.

== Petanque tournament participation ==
2003 Asian Championships in Kumagaya (Japan) Triples
2009 Asian Championships in Suphan Buri (Thailand) Triples Best 8
2012 Asian Championships in Hanoi (Vietnam) Doubles Best 8
2016 Asian Beach Games in Da Nang (Vietnam) Singles Bronze Medal
2017 Women's Petanque World Championships in China Triples Best 8
2018 Asian Championships in Kuala Lumpur (Malaysia) Triples
2019 Women's Petanque World Championships in Phnom Penh (Cambodia)
2022 Asian Championships in Bangkok (Thailand)
2023 Women's Petanque World Championships in Bangkok (Thailand) Triples
2024 Asian Championships in Taipei (Taiwan)

2025 Women's Petanque World Championships in Douai (France)

Ayumi Goma - Bronze medal - 2016 Asian Beach Games

== Sport Boules tournament participation ==
2026 Asia Oceana Sport Boules Championship in Myrtelford (Australia) Doubles Gold Medal

Ayumi Goma - Gold medal - 2026 Asia Oceana Sport Boules Championship

Ayumi Goma - Japanese Flag - 2026 Asia Oceana Sport Boules Championship
