= Bodybuilding at the 2016 Asian Beach Games =

- Venue: Biển Đông Park
- Dates: 27–28 September 2016

Bodybuilding competition at the 2016 Asian Beach Games was held in Da Nang, Vietnam from 27 to 28 September 2016 at Bien Dong Park, Da Nang, Vietnam.

== Medalists ==
Event	Gold	Silver	Bronze
158 cm	Phạm Kim Nhân; Vietnam	Takahiro Mizoguchi; Japan	Manoj Kumar Majumder; India
162 cm	Ali Abdulrasool; Bahrain	Lê Hoài Thương; Vietnam	Jung Han-pyo; South Korea
165 cm	Nguyễn Hải Âu; Vietnam	Kim Yeong-seok; South Korea	Sirigorn Khodkit; Thailand
168 cm	Sê Pha; Vietnam	Ran Maorong; China	Nguyễn Trường Giang; Vietnam
172 cm	Zheng Shaozhong; China	Wang Hua; China	Hiroaki Inoue; Japan
176 cm	Chen Kang; China	Nguyễn Minh Tiến; Vietnam	Eom Jin-ho; South Korea
180 cm	Mai Xuân Thức; Vietnam	Lee Young-chan; South Korea	Shunsuke Taguchi; Japan

== Medal table ==
Rank	Nation	Gold	Silver	Bronze	Total
1	Vietnam (VIE)	4	2	1	7
2	China (CHN)	2	2	0	4
3	Bahrain (BRN)	1	0	0	1
4	South Korea (KOR)	0	2	2	4
5	Japan (JPN)	0	1	2	3
6	India (IND)	0	0	1	1
6	Thailand (THA)	0	0	1	1
Totals (7 entries)		7	7	7	21

== Results ==
=== 158 cm ===
27–28 September

Rank	Athlete	Prej.	Final
1st place, gold medalist(s)	Phạm Kim Nhân (VIE)	5	15
2nd place, silver medalist(s)	Takahiro Mizoguchi (JPN)	13	35
3rd place, bronze medalist(s)	Manoj Kumar Majumder (IND)	13	42
4	Phanorn Onnim (THA)	20	60
5	Mohamed Moosa (MDV)	27	73
6	Waleed Al-Blooshi (UAE)	29	90
7	Gaurab Prasad Shrestha (NEP)	31	
8	Ieong Weng Kuan (MAC)	40	

=== 162 cm ===
28 September

Rank	Athlete	Final
1st place, gold medalist(s)	Ali Abdulrasool (BRN)	19
2nd place, silver medalist(s)	Lê Hoài Thương (VIE)	26
3rd place, bronze medalist(s)	Jung Han-pyo (KOR)	46
4	Shaheen Ibrahim Didi (MDV)	60
5	Mansour Al-Marzooqi (UAE)	75

=== 165 cm ===
28 September

Rank	Athlete	Final
1st place, gold medalist(s)	Nguyễn Hải Âu (VIE)	15
2nd place, silver medalist(s)	Kim Yeong-seok (KOR)	32
3rd place, bronze medalist(s)	Sirigorn Khodkit (THA)	44
4	Kasem Sirisot (THA)	57
5	Husham Hameed (MDV)	75

=== 168 cm ===
27–28 September

Rank	Athlete	Prej.	Final
1st place, gold medalist(s)	Sê Pha (VIE)	5	15
2nd place, silver medalist(s)	Ran Maorong (CHN)	12	30
3rd place, bronze medalist(s)	Nguyễn Trường Giang (VIE)	13	45
4	Sakhon Suksawat (THA)	24	72
5	Deba Raj Parajuli (NEP)	27	74
6	Mohamed Rashed (BRN)	26	79
7	Sengeegiin Otgontsend (MGL)	35	

=== 172 cm ===
27–28 September

Rank	Athlete	Prej.	Final
1st place, gold medalist(s)	Zheng Shaozhong (CHN)	5	21
2nd place, silver medalist(s)	Wang Hua (CHN)	15	34
3rd place, bronze medalist(s)	Hiroaki Inoue (JPN)	15	46
4	Kim Hyo-jung (KOR)	15	56
5	Kitti Phalaphon (THA)	31	85
—	Ekkaphon Sukthong (THA)	26	DSQ
7	Wong Chong Ieong (MAC)	35	
8	Jassem Al-Mheiri (UAE)	38	

=== 176 cm ===
28 September

Rank	Athlete	Final
1st place, gold medalist(s)	Chen Kang (CHN)	19
2nd place, silver medalist(s)	Nguyễn Minh Tiến (VIE)	26
3rd place, bronze medalist(s)	Eom Jin-ho (KOR)	45
4	Sarfaraz Khan (PAK)	60
5	Muhammad Akhtar Khan (PAK)	75

=== 180 cm ===
28 September

Rank	Athlete	Final
1st place, gold medalist(s)	Mai Xuân Thức (VIE)	15
2nd place, silver medalist(s)	Lee Young-chan (KOR)	30
3rd place, bronze medalist(s)	Shunsuke Taguchi (JPN)	45
4	Jasim Marhoon (BRN)	60
5	Ismail Shuau Abdulla (MDV)	75
—	Anas Phumesuk (THA)	DSQ
