= Pétanque at the 2016 Asian Beach Games =

- Venue: Phương Trang Area
- Dates: 25–30 September 2016

Beach Pétanque competition at the 2016 Asian Beach Games was held in Da Nang, Vietnam from 25 to 30 September 2016 at Phuong Trang Area.

== Medalists ==
=== Men ===
Event	Gold	Silver	Bronze
Shooting	Sok Chanmean; Cambodia	Huỳnh Công Tâm; Vietnam	Wattanachai Sonthung; Thailand
Shooting	Sok Chanmean; Cambodia	Huỳnh Công Tâm; Vietnam	Wang Kuo-chun; Chinese Taipei
Singles	Wanchaloem Srimueang; Thailand	Hafizuddin Mat Daud; Malaysia	Lar Mienmany; Laos
Singles	Wanchaloem Srimueang; Thailand	Hafizuddin Mat Daud; Malaysia	Nhem Bora; Cambodia
Doubles	Thailand; Thaloengkiat Phusa-at; Sarawut Sriboonpeng	Malaysia; Hakem Ahmad Saberi; Saiful Bahari Musmin	Vietnam; Nguyễn Văn Hoàng; Trần Phước Lộc
Doubles	Thailand; Thaloengkiat Phusa-at; Sarawut Sriboonpeng	Malaysia; Hakem Ahmad Saberi; Saiful Bahari Musmin	Cambodia; Heng Tha; Thong Chhoeun
Triples	Cambodia; Muong Tetmanet; Sieng Vanna; Tep Nora; Ya Chandararith	Thailand; Chanon Patan; Suksan Piachan; Thanakorn Sangkaew; Supan Thongphoo	Vietnam; Danh Hồng; Lê Minh Hải; Nguyễn Quốc Duy; Nguyễn Quốc Nhân
Triples	Cambodia; Muong Tetmanet; Sieng Vanna; Tep Nora; Ya Chandararith	Thailand; Chanon Patan; Suksan Piachan; Thanakorn Sangkaew; Supan Thongphoo	Malaysia; Azfar Hariz Aziz; Syed Akmal Fikri; Ahmad Safwan Safiin

=== Women ===
Event	Gold	Silver	Bronze
Shooting	Yan Linlin; China	Ke Leng; Cambodia	Thạch Thị Ánh Lan; Vietnam
Shooting	Yan Linlin; China	Ke Leng; Cambodia	Khoun Souksavat; Laos
Singles	Kattika Aramchote; Thailand	Manyvanh Souliya; Laos	Ayumi Goma; Japan
Singles	Kattika Aramchote; Thailand	Manyvanh Souliya; Laos	Nguyễn Thị Trang; Vietnam
Doubles	Thailand; Thongsri Thamakord; Phantipha Wongchuvej	Vietnam; Lê Thị Thu Mai; Nguyễn Thị Cẩm Duyên	Cambodia; Ouk Sreymom; Un Sreya
Doubles	Thailand; Thongsri Thamakord; Phantipha Wongchuvej	Vietnam; Lê Thị Thu Mai; Nguyễn Thị Cẩm Duyên	Laos; Siphachanh Keovongsoth; Bovilak Thepphakan
Triples	Cambodia; Khoun Yary; Sreng Sorakhim; Sun Khuthea; Vorng Chantha	Thailand; Nantawan Fueangsanit; Kanlayanee Lachiangkhong; Aumpawan Suwannaphruk; Nattaya Yoothong	Laos; Anhsany Dalavanh; Nidavanh Doungmanichanh; Lattana Phanasack; Chindavone Sisavath
Triples	Cambodia; Khoun Yary; Sreng Sorakhim; Sun Khuthea; Vorng Chantha	Thailand; Nantawan Fueangsanit; Kanlayanee Lachiangkhong; Aumpawan Suwannaphruk; Nattaya Yoothong	Vietnam; Dương Thị Huyền; Hoàng Thị Hạnh; Nguyễn Thị Thúy Kiều; Trần Thị Diễm Trang

=== Mixed ===
Event	Gold	Silver	Bronze
Doubles	Vietnam; Nguyễn Văn Quang; Ngô Thị Huyền Trân	Laos; Vansamay Neutsavath; Chansamone Vongsavath	Malaysia; Safi Azrol Othman; Anis Amira Basri
Doubles	Vietnam; Nguyễn Văn Quang; Ngô Thị Huyền Trân	Laos; Vansamay Neutsavath; Chansamone Vongsavath	Thailand; Sittichai Klincharoen; Uraiwan Hiranwong

== Medal table ==
Rank	Nation	Gold	Silver	Bronze	Total
1	Thailand (THA)	4	2	2	8
2	Cambodia (CAM)	3	1	3	7
3	Vietnam (VIE)	1	2	5	8
4	China (CHN)	1	0	0	1
5	Laos (LAO)	0	2	4	6
6	Malaysia (MAS)	0	2	2	4
7	Chinese Taipei (TPE)	0	0	1	1
7	Japan (JPN)	0	0	1	1
Totals (8 entries)		9	9	18	36

== Results ==
=== Men ===
==== Shooting ====
27 September

===== Qualification round =====
Rank	Athlete	Qual. 1	Qual. 2
1	Wattanachai Sonthung (THA)	40	
2	Wang Kuo-chun (TPE)	29	
3	Huỳnh Công Tâm (VIE)	27	39
4	Sok Chanmean (CAM)	26	36
5	Han Liqiang (CHN)	22	22
5	Haruki Kato (JPN)	24	22
7	Cheng Zhi Ming (SGP)	20	19
8	Somsamay Xamounty (LAO)	26	13
9	Bijay Kumar (IND)	0	0

===== Knockout round =====
Semifinals		Final
Wattanachai Sonthung (THA)	21
Sok Chanmean (CAM)	32	Sok Chanmean (CAM)	32
Wang Kuo-chun (TPE)	18	Huỳnh Công Tâm (VIE)	10
Huỳnh Công Tâm (VIE)	24

==== Singles ====
===== Preliminary =====
27 September

Group A
Pos	Athlete	Pld	W	L	PF	PA	MAS	THA	TPE	JPN	CHN
1	Hafizuddin Mat Daud (MAS)	4	3	1	49	33	—	13–8	13–8	13–4	10–13
2	Wanchaloem Srimueang (THA)	4	3	1	47	31	8–13	—	13–5	13–3	13–10
3	Sun Chia-yi (TPE)	4	2	2	39	41	8–13	5–13	—	13–6	13–9
4	Takayuki Watabe (JPN)	4	1	3	26	46	4–13	3–13	6–13	—	13–7
5	Xia Zhongyang (CHN)	4	1	3	39	49	13–10	10–13	9–13	7–13	—

Group B
Pos	Athlete	Pld	W	L	PF	PA	CAM	LAO	VIE	SGP	MGL
1	Nhem Bora (CAM)	4	3	1	47	27	—	13–4	8–13	13–8	13–2
2	Lar Mienmany (LAO)	4	3	1	43	31	4–13	—	13–4	13–8	13–6
3	Lý Hồi Giang (VIE)	4	3	1	43	31	13–8	4–13	—	13–5	13–5
4	Goh Wee Teck (SGP)	4	1	3	34	48	8–13	8–13	5–13	—	13–9
5	Altangereliin Bayarsaikhan (MGL)	4	0	4	22	52	2–13	6–13	5–13	9–13	—

Source: OCA

===== Knockout round =====
28 September

Semifinals		Final
Hafizuddin Mat Daud (MAS)	13
Lar Mienmany (LAO)	9	Hafizuddin Mat Daud (MAS)	8
Wanchaloem Srimueang (THA)	13	Wanchaloem Srimueang (THA)	13
Nhem Bora (CAM)	6

==== Doubles ====
===== Preliminary =====
25 September

Group A
Pos	Team	Pld	W	L	PF	PA	THA	CAM	LAO	CHN	SGP
1	Thaloengkiat Phusa-at (THA) Sarawut Sriboonpeng (THA)	4	4	0	52	2	—	13–1	13–1	13–0	13–0
2	Heng Tha (CAM) Thong Chhoeun (CAM)	4	3	1	40	34	1–13	—	13–9	13–2	13–10
3	Phoudthala Keokannika (LAO) Siphandone Sisouphone (LAO)	4	2	2	36	32	1–13	9–13	—	13–2	13–4
4	Sun Yuming (CHN) Zhao Yong (CHN)	4	1	3	16	50	0–13	2–13	2–13	—	12–11
5	Chin Xiong Sheng (SGP) Shanti Prakash Upadhayay (SGP)	4	0	4	25	51	0–13	10–13	4–13	11–12	—

Group B
Pos	Team	Pld	W	L	PF	PA	MAS	VIE	TPE	JPN	IND
1	Hakem Ahmad Saberi (MAS) Saiful Bahari Musmin (MAS)	4	4	0	48	12	—	9–8	13–4	13–0	13–0
2	Nguyễn Văn Hoàng (VIE) Trần Phước Lộc (VIE)	4	3	1	47	10	8–9	—	13–1	13–0	13–0
3	Lee Chiung-te (TPE) Tsai Chih-peng (TPE)	4	2	2	31	28	4–13	1–13	—	13–0	13–2
4	Hiroshi Katata (JPN) Yoshihiro Noda (JPN)	4	1	3	13	40	0–13	0–13	0–13	—	13–1
5	Romin Bharatkumar Chauhan (IND) Siddhesh Suresh Tayade (IND)	4	0	4	3	52	0–13	0–13	2–13	1–13	—

Source: OCA

===== Knockout round =====
26 September

Semifinals		Final
Thaloengkiat Phusa-at (THA); Sarawut Sriboonpeng (THA)	13
Nguyễn Văn Hoàng (VIE); Trần Phước Lộc (VIE)	7	Thaloengkiat Phusa-at (THA); Sarawut Sriboonpeng (THA)	13
Heng Tha (CAM); Thong Chhoeun (CAM)	7	Hakem Ahmad Saberi (MAS); Saiful Bahari Musmin (MAS)	6
Hakem Ahmad Saberi (MAS); Saiful Bahari Musmin (MAS)	13

==== Triples ====
===== Preliminary =====
29 September

Pos	Team	Pld	W	L	PF	PA	THA	CAM	MAS	VIE	LAO
1	Thailand	4	4	0	52	14	—	13–5	13–1	13–0	13–8
2	Cambodia	4	2	2	28	29	5–13	—	10–2	7–10	6–4
3	Malaysia	4	2	2	26	30	1–13	2–10	—	13–1	10–6
4	Vietnam	4	2	2	24	38	0–13	10–7	1–13	—	13–5
5	Laos	4	0	4	23	42	8–13	4–6	6–10	5–13	—

Source: OCA

===== Knockout round =====
30 September

Semifinals		Final
Thailand	13
Vietnam	2	Thailand	9
Cambodia	13	Cambodia	13
Malaysia	9

=== Women ===
==== Shooting ====
27 September

===== Qualification round =====
Rank	Athlete	Qual. 1	Qual. 2
1	Ke Leng (CAM)	37	
2	Khoun Souksavat (LAO)	25	
3	Yan Linlin (CHN)	23	32
4	Thạch Thị Ánh Lan (VIE)	18	31
5	Tanida Kachanthornpak (THA)	24	21
6	Keiko Katata (JPN)	11	15
7	Michel Sim (SGP)	11	9

===== Knockout round =====
Semifinals		Final
Ke Leng (CAM)	33
Thạch Thị Ánh Lan (VIE)	11	Ke Leng (CAM)	28
Khoun Souksavat (LAO)	23	Yan Linlin (CHN)	38
Yan Linlin (CHN)	26

==== Singles ====
===== Preliminary =====
27 September

Group A
Pos	Athlete	Pld	W	L	PF	PA	JPN	VIE	CHN	CAM	SGP
1	Ayumi Goma (JPN)	4	3	1	44	39	—	11–9	12–10	8–13	13–7
2	Nguyễn Thị Trang (VIE)	4	3	1	46	36	9–11	—	13–9	11–7	13–9
3	Chao Guijin (CHN)	4	2	2	45	40	10–12	9–13	—	13–9	13–6
4	Duong Dina (CAM)	4	2	2	42	41	13–8	7–11	9–13	—	13–9
5	Janice Tan (SGP)	4	0	4	31	52	7–13	9–13	6–13	9–13	—

Group B
Pos	Athlete	Pld	W	L	PF	PA	LAO	THA	MAS	MGL
1	Manyvanh Souliya (LAO)	3	2	1	35	23	—	10–7	12–13	13–3
2	Kattika Aramchote (THA)	3	2	1	32	24	7–10	—	12–9	13–5
3	Nur Thahira Tasnim (MAS)	3	2	1	35	26	13–12	9–12	—	13–2
4	Püreviin Lkhagvasüren (MGL)	3	0	3	10	39	3–13	5–13	2–13	—

Source: OCA

===== Knockout round =====
28 September

Semifinals		Final
Ayumi Goma (JPN)	0
Kattika Aramchote (THA)	13	Kattika Aramchote (THA)	13
Nguyễn Thị Trang (VIE)	10	Manyvanh Souliya (LAO)	7
Manyvanh Souliya (LAO)	13

==== Doubles ====
===== Preliminary =====
25 September

Group A
Pos	Team	Pld	W	L	PF	PA	CAM	LAO	MAS	IND
1	Ouk Sreymom (CAM) Un Sreya (CAM)	3	3	0	31	8	—	9–4	9–4	13–0
2	Siphachanh Keovongsoth (LAO) Bovilak Thepphakan (LAO)	3	2	1	26	18	4–9	—	9–7	13–2
3	Noor Mas Ayu Zahir Mozni (MAS) Suhartisera Zamri (MAS)	3	1	2	24	18	4–9	7–9	—	13–0
4	Sulochna Kataria (IND) Seema Rani (IND)	3	0	3	2	39	0–13	2–13	0–13	—

Group B
Pos	Team	Pld	W	L	PF	PA	VIE	THA	CHN	JPN
1	Lê Thị Thu Mai (VIE) Nguyễn Thị Cẩm Duyên (VIE)	3	3	0	39	2	—	13–1	13–1	13–0
2	Thongsri Thamakord (THA) Phantipha Wongchuvej (THA)	3	2	1	27	16	1–13	—	13–2	13–1
3	He Dan (CHN) Zhu Yanxia (CHN)	3	1	2	10	32	1–13	2–13	—	7–6
4	Akemi Kinoshita (JPN) Rieko Ujihara (JPN)	3	0	3	7	33	0–13	1–13	6–7	—

Source: OCA

===== Knockout round =====
26 September

Semifinals		Final
Ouk Sreymom (CAM); Un Sreya (CAM)	2
Thongsri Thamakord (THA); Phantipha Wongchuvej (THA)	13	Thongsri Thamakord (THA); Phantipha Wongchuvej (THA)	13
Siphachanh Keovongsoth (LAO); Bovilak Thepphakan (LAO)	8	Lê Thị Thu Mai (VIE); Nguyễn Thị Cẩm Duyên (VIE)	8
Lê Thị Thu Mai (VIE); Nguyễn Thị Cẩm Duyên (VIE)	13

==== Triples ====
===== Preliminary =====
29 September

Pos	Team	Pld	W	L	PF	PA	CAM	THA	VIE	LAO	MAS	IND
1	Cambodia	5	4	1	49	37	—	9–8	6–11	13–10	8–6	13–2
2	Thailand	5	3	2	47	26	8–9	—	5–8	13–3	8–5	13–1
3	Vietnam	5	3	2	47	35	11–6	8–5	—	7–11	8–13	13–0
4	Laos	5	3	2	49	37	10–13	3–13	11–7	—	12–4	13–0
5	Malaysia	5	2	3	41	37	6–8	5–8	13–8	4–12	—	13–1
6	India	5	0	5	4	65	2–13	1–13	0–13	0–13	1–13	—

Source: OCA

===== Knockout round =====
30 September

Semifinals		Final
Cambodia	13
Laos	7	Cambodia	13
Thailand	13	Thailand	9
Vietnam	3

=== Mixed ===
==== Doubles ====
===== Preliminary =====
25 September

Group A
Pos	Team	Pld	W	L	PF	PA	MAS	THA	CAM	IND
1	Safi Azrol Othman (MAS) Anis Amira Basri (MAS)	3	2	1	31	11	—	5–11	13–0	13–0
2	Sittichai Klincharoen (THA) Uraiwan Hiranwong (THA)	3	2	1	31	19	11–5	—	7–12	13–2
3	Yim Sophorn (CAM) Chhin Sreipich (CAM)	3	2	1	25	22	0–13	12–7	—	13–2
4	Pradeep Ravindra Sakhare (IND) Abhilasha Kumari (IND)	3	0	3	4	39	0–13	2–13	2–13	—

Group B
Pos	Team	Pld	W	L	PF	PA	MAS	THA	CAM
1	Vansamay Neutsavath (LAO) Chansamone Vongsavath (LAO)	2	2	0	26	8	—	13–6	13–2
2	Nguyễn Văn Quang (VIE) Ngô Thị Huyền Trân (VIE)	2	1	1	13	17	6–13	—	7–4
3	Zhang Ruijun (CHN) Wang Yanjing (CHN)	2	0	2	6	20	2–13	4–7	—

Source: OCA

===== Knockout round =====
26 September

Semifinals		Final
Safi Azrol Othman (MAS); Anis Amira Basri (MAS)	3
Nguyễn Văn Quang (VIE); Ngô Thị Huyền Trân (VIE)	13	Nguyễn Văn Quang (VIE); Ngô Thị Huyền Trân (VIE)	13
Sittichai Klincharoen (THA); Uraiwan Hiranwong (THA)	12	Vansamay Neutsavath (LAO); Chansamone Vongsavath (LAO)	3
Vansamay Neutsavath (LAO); Chansamone Vongsavath (LAO)	13
