= Yoshimi Sadamatsu =

Japanese vovinam athlete

Yoshimi Sadamatsu (貞松慶美, Sadamatsu Yoshimi) is a Japanese vovinam athlete from Tokyo. She won a bronze medal in dragon-tiger form event at the 2016 Asian Beach Games held in Danang, Vietnam and became the first ever Japanese to win a medal at vovinam.
