= List of Asian Games medalists in triathlon =

This is the complete list of Asian Games medalists in triathlon from 2006 to 2022.

== Events ==
=== Men's individual ===
Games	Gold	Silver	Bronze
2006 Doha	Dmitriy Gaag (KAZ)	Daniel Lee (HKG)	Danil Sapunov (KAZ)
2010 Guangzhou	Yuichi Hosoda (JPN)	Ryosuke Yamamoto (JPN)	Dmitriy Gaag (KAZ)
2014 Incheon	Yuichi Hosoda (JPN)	Hirokatsu Tayama (JPN)	Bai Faquan (CHN)
2018 Jakarta–Palembang	Jumpei Furuya (JPN)	Ayan Beisenbayev (KAZ)	Li Mingxu (CHN)
2022 Hangzhou	Kenji Nener (JPN)	Makoto Odakura (JPN)	Ayan Beisenbayev (KAZ)

=== Women's individual ===
Games	Gold	Silver	Bronze
2006 Doha	Wang Hongni (CHN)	Ai Ueda (JPN)	Akiko Sekine (JPN)
2010 Guangzhou	Mariko Adachi (JPN)	Akane Tsuchihashi (JPN)	Jang Yun-jung (KOR)
2014 Incheon	Ai Ueda (JPN)	Juri Ide (JPN)	Wang Lianyuan (CHN)
2018 Jakarta–Palembang	Yuko Takahashi (JPN)	Zhong Mengying (CHN)	Hoi Long (MAC)
2022 Hangzhou	Yuko Takahashi (JPN)	Lin Xinyu (CHN)	Yang Yifan (CHN)

=== Mixed relay ===
Games	Gold	Silver	Bronze
2014 Incheon	Japan (JPN); Yuka Sato; Hirokatsu Tayama; Ai Ueda; Yuichi Hosoda	South Korea (KOR); Jeong Hye-rim; Heo Min-ho; Kim Gyu-ri; Kim Ji-hwan	China (CHN); Xin Lingxi; Duan Zhengyu; Huang Yuting; Bai Faquan
2018 Jakarta–Palembang	Japan (JPN); Yuka Sato; Jumpei Furuya; Yuko Takahashi; Yuichi Hosoda	South Korea (KOR); Jang Yun-jung; Kim Ji-hwan; Park Ye-jin; Heo Min-ho	Hong Kong (HKG); Bailee Brown; Law Leong Tim; Hilda Choi; Wong Tsz To
2022 Hangzhou	Japan (JPN); Kenji Nener; Yuko Takahashi; Takumi Hojo; Yuka Sato	China (CHN); Li Mingxu; Lin Xinyu; Fan Junjie; Huang Anqi	Hong Kong (HKG); Wong Tsz To; Bailee Brown; Jason Ng; Charlotte Hall
