= Triathlon at the Asian Games =

- Governing bodies: TRI (World) / AST (Asia)
- Events: 3 (men: 1; women: 1; mixed: 1)

Games
- 1951; 1954; 1958; 1962; 1966; 1970; 1974; 1978; 1982; 1986; 1990; 1994; 1998; 2002; 2006; 2010; 2014; 2018; 2022; 2026
- Medalists

Triathlon has been an event at the Asian Games since 2006 in Doha, Qatar.

== Editions ==
Games	Year	Host city	Best nation
15	2006	Doha, Qatar	Kazakhstan
16	2010	Guangzhou, China	Japan
17	2014	Incheon, South Korea	Japan
18	2018	Jakarta–Palembang, Indonesia	Japan
19	2022	Hangzhou, China	Japan
20	2026	Aichi–Nagoya, Japan	China

== Events ==
Event	06	10	14	18	22	26	Years
Men's individual	X	X	X	X	X	X	6
Women's individual	X	X	X	X	X	X	6
Mixed relay			X	X	X	X	4
Total	2	2	3	3	3	3	16

== Medal table ==
Rank	Nation	Gold	Silver	Bronze	Total
1	Japan (JPN)	12	7	2	21
2	China (CHN)	3	5	5	13
3	Kazakhstan (KAZ)	1	1	4	6
4	South Korea (KOR)	0	2	1	3
5	Hong Kong (HKG)	0	1	3	4
6	Macau (MAC)	0	0	1	1
Totals (6 entries)		16	16	16	48

== Participating nations ==
Nation	06	10	14	18	22	Years
Bahrain			2	2		2
Cambodia					1	1
China	4	4	6	5	5	5
Chinese Taipei	2			6		2
Hong Kong	4	2	6	5	5	5
India	2	2				2
Indonesia				6	1	2
Iran				1		1
Japan	4	4	5	5	5	5
Jordan			1		2	2
Kazakhstan	3	4	5	3	5	5
Kuwait			5	3	2	3
Kyrgyzstan					1	1
Lebanon	1					1
Macau	3	3	5	5	4	5
Malaysia	3	2		4		3
Mongolia	2	2	4	4	5	5
Nepal			4	4	4	3
Oman	2					1
Palestine				2	2	2
Philippines	4	2	5	6	5	5
Qatar				1	2	2
Singapore					4	1
South Korea	4	4	5	5	5	5
Sri Lanka				1		1
Syria	2	1	1	2		4
Thailand			6	5	5	3
United Arab Emirates				2	3	2
Uzbekistan	3	2	5	4	4	5
Number of nations	15	12	15	22	20	
Number of athletes	43	32	65	81	70	
