= 2015 in triathlon =

This topic reveals a large number of triathlon events and their results for 2015.

== World Triathlon Series ==
- March 6 – September 20: 2015 ITU World Triathlon Series
  - March 6 & 7 in (United Arab Emirates) Abu Dhabi
    - Men's Elite winner: (Spain) Mario Mola
    - Women's Elite winner: (United States) Gwen Jorgensen
  - March 28 & 29 in (New Zealand) Auckland
    - Men's Elite winner: (United Kingdom) Jonathan Brownlee
    - Women's Elite winner: (United States) Gwen Jorgensen
  - April 11 & 12 in (Australia) Gold Coast
    - Men's Elite winner: (United Kingdom) Jonathan Brownlee
    - Women's Elite winner: (United States) Gwen Jorgensen
  - April 25 & 26 in (South Africa) Cape Town
    - Men's Elite winner: (United Kingdom) Alistair Brownlee
    - Women's Elite winner: (United Kingdom) Vicky Holland
  - May 16 & 17 in (Japan) Yokohama
    - Men's Elite winner: (Spain) Javier Gómez Noya
    - Women's Elite winner: (United States) Gwen Jorgensen
  - May 30 & 31 in (United Kingdom) London
    - Men's Elite winner: (United Kingdom) Alistair Brownlee
    - Women's Elite winner: (United States) Gwen Jorgensen
  - July 18 & 19 in (Germany) Hamburg
    - Men's Elite winner: (France) Vincent Luis
    - Women's Elite winner: (United States) Gwen Jorgensen
  - August 22 & 23 in (Sweden) Stockholm
    - Men's Elite winner: (Spain) Javier Gómez Noya
    - Women's Elite winner: (United States) Sarah True
  - September 5 & 6 in (Canada) Edmonton
    - Men's Elite winner: (South Africa) Richard Murray
    - Women's Elite winner: (United Kingdom) Vicky Holland
  - September 15 – 20 in (United States) Chicago (Grand Final)
    - Aquathlon
    - Men's Elite Aquathlon winner: (Slovakia) Richard Varga
    - Women's Elite Aquathlon winner: (Russia) Anastasia Abrosimova
    - Men's Junior Aquathlon winner: (Venezuela) Yhousman Perdomo
    - Women's Junior Aquathlon winner: (Croatia) Elisabetta Vitasović
    - Men's Under 23 Aquathlon winner: (Canada) Ben Sayles
    - Women's Under 23 Aquathlon winner: (Venezuela) Joselyn Brea
    - Individual events
    - Men's Elite winner: (Spain) Mario Mola
    - Women's Elite winner: (United States) Gwen Jorgensen
    - Men's Junior winner: (Brazil) Manoel Messias
    - Women's Junior winner: (Germany) Laura Lindemann
    - Men's Under 23 winner: (Australia) Jake Birtwhistle
    - Women's Under 23 winner: (France) Audrey Merle

== Triathlon World Cup ==
- March 14 – October 25: 2015 ITU World Cup
  - March 14 & 15: 2015 Mooloolaba ITU Triathlon World Cup #1 in Australia
    - Men's Elite winner: (France) David Hauss
    - Women's Elite winner: (Spain) Tamara Gómez Garrido
  - March 21 & 22: 2015 New Plymouth ITU Triathlon World Cup #2 in New Zealand
    - Men's Elite winner: (South Africa) Richard Murray
    - Women's Elite winner: (United States) Kaitlin Donner
  - May 9 & 10: 2015 Chengdu ITU Triathlon World Cup #3 in China
    - Men's Elite winner: (Australia) Ryan Fisher
    - Women's Elite winner: (United States) Renee Tomlin
  - June 14: 2015 Huatulco ITU Triathlon World Cup #4 in Mexico
    - Men's Elite winner: (Mexico) Irving Perez
    - Women's Elite winner: (Chile) Valentina Carvallo
  - August 8 & 9: 2015 Tiszaújváros ITU Triathlon World #5 in Hungary
    - Men's Elite winner: (Russia) Igor Andreyevich Polyanski
    - Women's Elite winner: (Australia) Felicity Sheedy-Ryan
  - September 12 & 13: 2015 Montreal ITU Triathlon World Cup #6 in Canada
    - Cancelled, due to the schedule of other events that conflicts with this World Cup. There would not be any replacement event here.
  - October 4: 2015 Cozumel ITU Triathlon World Cup #7 in Mexico
    - Men's Elite winner: (South Africa) Richard Murray
    - Women's Elite winner: (Japan) Ai Ueda
  - October 17 & 18: 2015 Alanya ITU Triathlon World Cup #8 in Turkey
    - Men's Elite winner: (Portugal) João José Pereira
    - Women's Elite winner: (Ukraine) Yuliya Yelistratova
  - October 24: 2015 Tongyeong ITU Triathlon World Cup #9 in South Korea (final)
    - Men's Elite winner: (United Kingdom) Matthew Sharp
    - Women's Elite winner: (Japan) Yuka Sato

== Cross triathlon ==
- February 28 & March 1: 2015 OTU Cross Triathlon Oceania Championships in (Australia) Snowy Mountains
  - Men's Elite winner: (Australia) Courtney Atkinson
  - Women's Elite winner: (Australia) Erin Densham
- March 28: 2015 Pokhara ASTC Cross Triathlon South Asian Championships in Nepal
  - Men's Elite winner: (India) Mahesh Lourembam
  - Women's Elite winner: (India) Pooja Chaurushi
- June 14: 2015 Revine Lago - Tarzo ETU TNatura Cross Triathlon European Cup in Italy
  - Men's Elite winner: (France) Arthur Serrieres
  - Women's Elite winner: (Italy) Monica Cibin
- July 19: 2015 ETU TNatura Cross Triathlon European Championships in (Germany) Schluchsee, Baden-Württemberg
  - Men's Elite winner: (France) Arthur Forissier
  - Women's Elite winner: (Switzerland) Renata Bucher
- September 26 & 27: 2015 ITU Cross Triathlon World Championships in (Italy) Sardinia
  - Men's Elite winner: (Spain) Ruben Ruzafa
  - Women's Elite winner: (Bermuda) Flora Duffy

== Duathlon ==
- January 9 & 10: 2015 ATU Sprint Duathlon African and Pan Arab Championships in (Egypt) Luxor
  - Men's Elite winner: (Ukraine) Yegor Martynenko
  - Women's Elite winner: (Ukraine) Oleksandra Stepanenko
- April 25: 2015 ETU Sprint and Standard Distance Duathlon European Championships in (Spain) Alcobendas
  - Men's Elite winner: (France) Benoit Nicolas
  - Women's Elite winner: (France) Sandra Levenez
  - Men's Juniors winner: (Spain) Ignacio Gonzalez Garcia
  - Women's Juniors winner: (France) Lucie Picard
  - Men's U23 winner: (Portugal) Filipe Azevedo
  - Women's U23 winner: (Italy) Giorgia Priarone
- July 25 & 26: 2015 CAMTRI Duathlon American Championships in (Colombia) Cali
  - Men's Elite winner: (Colombia) David Guete
  - Women's Elite winner: (Brazil) Nayara Luniere
- October 14 – 18: 2015 ITU Duathlon World Championships in (Australia) Adelaide
  - Men's Elite winner: (Spain) Emilio Martin
  - Women's Elite winner: (United Kingdom) Emma Pallant
  - Junior Men's winner: (United Kingdom) Ben Dijkstra
  - Junior Women's winner: (South Africa) Gizelde Strauss
  - Men's U23 winner: (United States) Matthew Mcelroy
  - Women's U23 winner: (Australia) Annelise Jefferies

== Long distance triathlon ==
- January 25: 2015 ITU Long Distance Triathlon and Iberoamerican Championships in (Cuba) Havana
  - Men's Elite winner: (Argentina) Juan Manuel Asconape
  - Women's Elite winner: (United States) Kathleen Smith
- April 11 & 12: 2015 ETU Powerman Long Distance and Sprint Duathlon European Championships in (Netherlands) Horst aan de Maas
  - Men's Elite winner: (Belgium) Kenneth Vandendriessche
  - Women's Elite winner: (Switzerland) Laura Hrebec
  - Men's Elite Sprint Distance winner: (Italy) Alberto Della Pasqua
  - Women's Elite Sprint Distance winner: (Germany) Franziska Scheffler
- May 24: 2015 ETU Challenge Middle Distance Triathlon European Championships in (Italy) Rimini
  - Men's Elite winner: (Czech Republic) Filip Ospaly
  - Women's Elite winner: (Finland) Kaisa Lehtonen
- June 27: 2015 ITU Long Distance Triathlon World Championships in (Sweden) Motala
  - Men's Elite winner: (France) Cyril Viennot
  - Women's Elite winner: (United States) Mary Beth Ellis
- September 13: 2015 Weihai ITU Long Distance Triathlon Series Event in China
  - Men's Elite winner: (Russia) Nikolay Yaroshenko
  - Women's Elite winner: (Poland) Ewa Bugdol
- September 13: 2015 ETU Challenge Long Distance Triathlon European Championships in (United Kingdom) Weymouth, Dorset
  - Men's Elite winner: (Poland) Marek Jaskolka
  - Women's Elite winner: (Sweden) Camilla Lindholm

== Winter triathlon ==
- January 31: 2015 ETU Winter Triathlon European Championships in (Spain) Reinosa
  - Men's Elite winner: (Russia) Pavel Andreev
  - Women's Elite winner: (Russia) Olga Parfinenko
- February 8: 2015 Quebec ITU S3 Winter Triathlon World Cup in (Canada) Quebec City
  - Men's Elite winner: (Russia) Pavel Andreev
  - Women's Elite winner: (Russia) Olga Parfinenko
- February 14: 2015 Lahti ITU S3 Winter Triathlon World Cup in Finland
  - Men's Elite winner: (Russia) Pavel Andreev
  - Women's Elite winner: (Canada) Claude Godbout

== European Cup (ETU) ==
- March 21 – September 26: European Triathlon Union Cup
  - March 21 & 22: 2015 ETU Triathlon European Cup #1 in (Portugal) Quarteira
    - Men's Elite winner: (France) Dorian Coninx
    - Women's Elite winner: (South Africa) Gillian Sanders
  - April 19: 2015 ETU Triathlon European Cup #2 in (Spain) Melilla
    - Men's Elite winner: (United Kingdom) Gordon Benson
    - Women's Elite winner: (Germany) Marlene Gomez-Islinger
  - May 3: 2015 ETU Triathlon European Cup #3 in (Turkey) Antalya
    - Men's Elite winner: (United Kingdom) Mark Buckingham
    - Women's Elite winner: (Russia) Elena Danilova
  - June 21: 2015 ETU Sprint Triathlon European Cup #4 in (Bulgaria) Burgas
    - Men's Elite winner: (France) Brice Daubord
    - Women's Elite winner: (Ukraine) Yuliya Yelistratova
  - June 27: 2015 ETU Triathlon European Cup #5 in (Ukraine) Kyiv
    - Men's Elite winner: (Ukraine) Yegor Martynenko
    - Women's Elite winner: (Ukraine) Inna Ryzhykh
  - June 28: 2015 ETU Sprint Triathlon European Cup #6 in (Turkey) Istanbul
    - Men's Elite winner: (France) Felix Duchampt
    - Women's Elite winner: (Sweden) Lisa Norden
  - July 4: 2015 ETU Triathlon Premium European Cup #7 in (Netherlands) Holten
    - Men's Elite winner: (France) Aurélien Lebrun
    - Women's Elite winner: (Netherlands) Rachel Klamer
  - July 5: 2015 ETU Sprint Triathlon European Cup #8 in (Estonia) Tartu
    - Men's Elite winner: (Australia) Declan Wilson
    - Women's Elite winner: (Hungary) Zsanett Horváth
  - July 19: 2015 ETU Triathlon European Cup #9 in (France) Châteauroux
    - Men's Elite winner: (France) Aurélien Lebrun
    - Women's Elite winner: (Germany) Lisa Sieburger
  - August 9: 2015 ETU Sprint Triathlon European Cup #10 in (Latvia) Riga
    - Men's Elite winner: (Russia) Alexander Bryukhankov
    - Women's Elite winner: (Germany) Lisa Sieburger
  - August 15 & 16: 2015 ETU Triathlon European Cup #11 in (Turkey) Eğirdir
    - Men's Elite winner: (Russia) Denis Vasiliev
    - Women's Elite winner: (Russia) Arina Shulgina
  - August 23: 2015 ETU Triathlon European Cup #12 in (Czech Republic) Karlovy Vary
    - Men's Elite winner: (France) Aurélien Lebrun
    - Women's Elite winner: (France) Audrey Merle
  - September 6: 2015 ETU Triathlon Premium European Cup #13 in (Romania) Constanța-Mamaia (final)
    - Men's Elite winner: (Spain) Uxio Abuin Ares
    - Women's Elite winner: (Russia) Valentina Zapatrina
  - September 26: 2015 ETU Triathlon European Cup Final in (Russia) Sochi
    - Men's Elite winner: (Russia) Dmitry Polyanskiy
    - Women's Elite winner: (Germany) Lisa Sieburger

== Junior European Cup (ETU) ==
- March 21 – October 18: 2015 European Triathlon Union Junior Cup
  - March 21 & 22: 2015 Quarteira ETU Triathlon Junior European Cup #1 in Portugal
    - Junior Men: (United Kingdom) Ben Dijkstra
    - Junior Women: (Germany) Lisa Tertsch
  - April 19: 2015 Melilla ETU Triathlon Junior European Cup #2 in Spain
    - Junior Men: (Spain) Ignacio Gonzalez Garcia
    - Junior Women: (Spain) Cecilia Santamaria Surroca
  - May 30: 2015 Vienna ETU Triathlon Junior European Cup #3 in Austria
    - Junior Men: (Germany) Lasse Lührs
    - Junior Women: (Denmark) Alberte Kjær Pedersen
  - June 6: 2015 Kupiškis ETU Triathlon Junior European Cup #4 in Lithuania
    - Junior Men: (Israel) Omri Bahat
    - Junior Women: (Israel) Yuval Gome
  - June 21: 2015 Burgas ETU Junior Triathlon European Cup #5 in Bulgaria
    - Junior Men: (Belarus) Mikita Katsianeu
    - Junior Women: (Austria) Therese Feuersinger
  - July 4: 2015 Holten ETU Triathlon Junior European Cup #6 in the Netherlands
    - Junior Men: (Norway) Gustav Iden
    - Junior Women: (United States) Taylor Knibb
  - July 18: 2015 Châteauroux ETU Triathlon Junior European Cup #7 in France
    - Junior Men: (Australia) Matthew Roberts
    - Junior Women: (Czech Republic) Jana Machacova
  - August 2: 2015 Tábor ETU Triathlon Junior European Cup #8 in the Czech Republic
    - Junior Men: (Kazakhstan) Ayan Beisenbayev
    - Junior Women: (Czech Republic) Jana Machacova
  - August 8: 2015 Tiszaújváros ETU Triathlon Junior European Cup #9 in Hungary
    - Junior Men: (United Kingdom) Ben Dijkstra
    - Junior Women: (United Kingdom) Olivia Mathias
  - August 30: 2015 Tulcea ETU Triathlon Junior European Cup #10 in Romania
    - Junior Men: (Germany) Tim Siepmann
    - Junior Women: (Germany) Nina Eim
  - September 5: 2015 Bled ETU Triathlon Junior European Cup #11 in Slovenia
    - Junior Men: (Sweden) Gabriel Sandör
    - Junior Women: (Germany) Lisa Tertsch
  - October 18: 2015 Alanya ETU Triathlon Junior European Cup #12 in Turkey (final)
    - Junior Men: (Switzerland) Max Studer
    - Junior Women: (Denmark) Alberte Kjær Pedersen

== Oceania Triathlon Union (OTU) ==
- January 9 – October 25: 2015 Oceania Triathlon Union events
  - January 9: 2015 OTU Triathlon Mixed Relay Oceania Championships in (New Zealand) Mount Maunganui
    - For main website, click here .
  - January 10 & 11: 2015 OTU Triathlon Junior Oceania Championships in (Australia) Penrith, New South Wales
    - Junior Men: (Australia) Matthew Hauser
    - Junior Women: (Australia) Kira Hedgeland
  - January 11: 2015 OTU Paratriathlon Oceania Championships in (Australia) Penrith
  - Note: There was no Women's PT2 event here.
    - Men's PT1 winner: (Australia) Bill Chaffey
    - Men's PT2 winner: (Australia) Brant Garvey
    - Men's PT3 winner: (Australia) Justin Godfrey (default)
    - Men's PT4 winner: (Australia) Jack Swift
    - Men's PT5 winner: (Australia) Jonathan Goerlach
    - Women's PT1 winner: (Australia) Emily Tapp (default)
    - Women's PT3 winner: (Australia) Sally Pilbeam
    - Women's PT4 winner: (Australia) Claire Mclean
    - Women's PT5 winner: (Australia) Casey Hyde (default)
  - February 1: 2015 OTU Sprint Triathlon Oceania Championships in (New Zealand) Kinloch
    - Men's Elite winner: (New Zealand) Sam Osborne
    - Women's Elite winner: (New Zealand) Sophie Corbidge
  - February 13: 2015 OTU Sprint Triathlon Oceania Cup #1 in (New Zealand) Takapuna
    - Men's Elite winner: (New Zealand) Ryan Sissons
    - Women's Elite winner: (New Zealand) Sophie Corbidge
  - February 21: 2015 OTU Triathlon Oceania Championships in (Australia) Devonport, Tasmania
    - Men's Elite winner: (Australia) Jacob Birtwhistle
    - Women's Elite winner: (Australia) Jaz Hedgeland
  - March 7 & 8: 2015 OTU Sprint Triathlon Oceania Cup #2 in (Australia) Wollongong
    - Men's Elite winner: (Australia) Jacob Birtwhistle
    - Women's Elite winner: (Canada) Amelie Kretz
  - March 14 & 15: 2015 OTU Triathlon Oceania Cup #3 in (Australia) Mooloolaba
    - Men's Elite winner: (Australia) Daniel Coleman
    - Women's Elite winner: (Australia) Kelly-Ann Perkins
  - June 6 & 7: 2015 OTU Sprint Triathlon Oceania Cup #4 in (Fiji) Suva
    - Men's Elite winner: (Australia) Matthew Hauser
    - Women's Elite winner: (Australia) Brittany Dutton
  - October 25: 2015 OTU Triathlon Oceania Cup #5 in (French Polynesia) Tahiti (final)
    - Men's Elite winner: (Greece) James Chronis

== Confederación Americana de Triathlon (CAMTRI) ==
- January 16 – December 6: 2015 CAMTRI American Cup events
  - January 16 – 18: 2015 CAMTRI Triathlon American Cup and South American Championships in (Argentina) La Paz, Entre Ríos
    - Men's Elite winner: (Argentina) Gonzalo Tellechea
    - Women's Elite winner: (Chile) Valentina Carvallo
  - January 24: 2015 CAMTRI Sprint Triathlon American Cup and Iberoamerican Championships in (Cuba) Havana
    - Men's Elite winner: (Mexico) Rodrigo González
    - Women's Elite winner: (United States) Renee Tomlin
  - January 25: 2015 CAMTRI Middle Distance Triathlon Iberoamerican Championships in Havana
    - Men's Elite winner: (Spain) Marcel Zamora
    - Women's Elite winner: (France) Mathilde Batailler
  - February 1: 2015 Punta Guilarte CAMTRI Triathlon American Cup in Arroyo, Puerto Rico
    - Men's Elite winner: (Costa Rica) Leonardo Chacón
    - Women's Elite winner: (United States) Erin Jones
  - February 14: 2015 Mendoza CAMTRI Triathlon American Cup in Argentina
    - Men's Elite winner: (Argentina) Gonzalo Tellechea
    - Women's Elite winner: (Chile) Valentina Carvallo
  - February 22: 2015 Barranquilla CAMTRI Triathlon American Cup and Central American and Caribbean Championships in Colombia
    - Men's Elite winner: (Brazil) Bruno Matheus
    - Women's Elite winner: (Cuba) Lisandra Hernandez
  - February 28: 2015 Mazatlán CAMTRI Triathlon American Cup in Mexico
    - Men's Elite winner: (Mexico) Rodrigo González
    - Women's Elite winner: (Mexico) Andrea Diaz
  - March 7 & 8: 2015 Clermont CAMTRI Sprint Triathlon American Cup in the United States
    - Men's Elite winner: (United States) Kaleb Vanort
    - Women's Elite winner: (United States) Sarah Haskins
  - March 8: 2015 Playa Hermosa CAMTRI Triathlon American Cup in Costa Rica
    - Men's Elite winner: (Ecuador) Juan Jose Andrade Figueroa
    - Women's Elite winner: (Puerto Rico) Melissa Rios
  - March 14 & 15: 2015 Sarasota CAMTRI Sprint Triathlon American Cup and Caribbean Championships in the United States
    - Men's Elite winner: (United States) Eric Lagerstrom
    - Women's Elite winner: (United States) Summer Cook
  - March 14 & 15: 2015 Lima CAMTRI Triathlon American Cup and Bolivarian Championships in Peru
    - Men's Elite winner: (Chile) Felipe van de Wyngard
    - Women's Elite winner: (Chile) Favia Diaz
  - March 21: 2015 La Paz CAMTRI Triathlon American Cup in Mexico
    - Men's Elite winner: (Chile) Felipe van de Wyngard
    - Women's Elite winner: (Canada) Dominika Jamnicky
  - April 12: 2015 Salinas CAMTRI Triathlon American Cup in Ecuador
    - Men's Elite winner: (Brazil) Manoel Messias
    - Women's Elite winner: (Ecuador) Elizabeth Bravo
  - April 18: 2015 Puerto San José CAMTRI Triathlon Junior Central American and Caribbean Championships in Guatemala
    - Men's Junior winner: (Panama) Peter Vega
    - Women's Junior winner: (El Salvador) Giovanna Michelle Gonzalez Miranda
  - April 18 & 19: 2015 Bridgetown CAMTRI Sprint Triathlon American Cup in Barbados
    - Men's Elite winner: (United States) Eric Lagerstrom
    - Women's Elite winner: (United States) Erin Dolan
  - May 1 – 3: 2015 Monterrey CAMTRI Triathlon American Championships in Mexico
    - Men's Elite winner: (Mexico) Cesar Saracho
    - Women's Elite winner: (Mexico) Cecilia Gabriela Perez Flores
  - May 23: 2015 Ixtapa CAMTRI Triathlon American Cup in Mexico
    - Men's Elite winner: (United States) John O'Neill
    - Women's Elite winner: (Mexico) Vanesa de la Torre
  - June 6: 2015 Dallas CAMTRI Sprint Triathlon American Cup in the United States
    - Men's Elite winner: (Canada) Russell Pennock
    - Women's Elite winner: (United States) Erin Jones
  - June 20: 2015 Monroe CAMTRI Triathlon Junior American Cup in the United States
    - Men's Junior winner: (United States) Darr Smith
    - Women's Junior winner: (United States) Tamara Gorman
  - June 20 & 21: 2015 Ibarra CAMTRI Triathlon American Cup in Ecuador
    - Men's Elite winner: (Mexico) Eder Mejia
    - Women's Elite winner: (Ecuador) Elizabeth Bravo
  - July 25 & 26: 2015 Magog CAMTRI Triathlon American Cup in Canada
    - Men's Elite winner: (United States) Eli Hemming
    - Women's Elite winner: (United States) Erin Dolan
  - September 5: 2015 Edmonton CAMTRI Triathlon Junior American Cup in Canada
    - Junior Men's winner: (Australia) Matthew Hauser
    - Junior Women's winner: (Canada) Kyla Roy
  - October 11: 2015 Punta Guilarte CAMTRI Triathlon Premium American Cup in Puerto Rico
    - Men's Elite winner: (United States) Jason West
    - Women's Elite winner: (United States) Taylor Spivey
  - October 18: 2015 Cartagena CAMTRI Triathlon American Cup in Colombia
    - Men's Elite winner: (United States) Jason West
    - Women's Elite winner: (Ecuador) Steffy Mishel Salazar Perez
  - November 15: 2015 Buenos Aires CAMTRI Triathlon American Cup Final in Argentina
    - Men's Elite winner: (Brazil) Reinaldo Colucci
    - Women's Elite winner: (Brazil) Beatriz Neres
  - November 21: 2015 La Paz CAMTRI Triathlon Junior American Cup in Bolivia
    - Junior Men's winner: (Ecuador) Gabriel Bravo
    - Junior Women's winner: (Ecuador) Isabel Berrezueta
  - December 12: 2015 Paracas CAMTRI Middle Distance Triathlon American Cup in Peru (final)
    - Men's Elite winner: (Peru) Salvador Ruiz Gonzales

== African Triathlon Union (ATU) ==
- February 15 – November 7: 2015 ATU Triathlon African Cup events
  - February 15: 2015 Cape Town ATU Sprint Triathlon African Cup in South Africa
    - Men's Elite winner: (South Africa) Henri Schoeman
    - Women's Elite winner: (Bermuda) Flora Duffy
  - March 1: 2015 Buffalo City ATU Sprint Triathlon African Cup in South Africa
    - Men's Elite winner: (Turkey) Jonas Schomburg
    - Women's Elite winner: (South Africa) Carlyn Fischer
  - March 14: 2015 Hurghada ATU Triathlon African Cup in Egypt
    - Men's Elite winner: (Azerbaijan) Rostyslav Pevtsov
    - Women's Elite winner: (Russia) Arina Shulgina
  - March 28: 2015 Troutbeck ATU Triathlon African Cup in Zimbabwe
    - Men's Elite winner: (South Africa) Wian Sullwald
    - Women's Elite winner: (South Africa) Jodie Berry
  - June 7: 2015 Le Morne ATU Sprint Triathlon African Cup in Mauritius
    - Men's Elite winner: (South Africa) Basson Engelbrecht
    - Women's Elite winner: (Australia) Emma Jeffcoat
  - October 24: 2015 Larache ATU Sprint Triathlon African Cup in Morocco
    - Men's Elite winner: (Spain) Antonio Benito
    - Women's Elite winner: (Portugal) Melanie Santos
  - November 7: 2015 Agadir ATU Triathlon African Cup in Morocco (final)
    - Men's Elite winner: (Estonia) Aleksandr Latin
    - Women's Elite winner: (South Africa) Mari Rabie

== Asian Triathlon Confederation (ASTC) ==
- April 25 – November 28: 2015 ASTC Triathlon Asian Cup events
  - April 25 & 26: 2015 Subic Bay ASTC Triathlon Asian Cup in the Philippines
    - Men's Elite winner: (Canada) Tyler Mislawchuk
    - Women's Elite winner: (Japan) Chika Sato
  - June 21: 2015 Gamagōri ASTC Triathlon Asian Cup in Japan
    - Men's Elite winner: (Japan) Jumpei Furuya
    - Women's Elite winner: (Japan) Yurie Kato
  - June 27: 2015 Burabay District ASTC Sprint Triathlon Asian Cup in Kazakhstan
    - Men's Elite winner: (Kazakhstan) Ayan Beisenbayev
    - Women's Elite winner: (Hong Kong) Hilda Yan Yin Choi
  - July 4: 2015 Shizuishan ASTC Triathlon Premium Asian Cup in China
    - Men's Elite winner: (China) Bai Faquan
    - Women's Elite winner: (China) WANG Lianyuan
  - July 12: 2015 Osaka ASTC Sprint Triathlon Asian Cup in Japan
    - Men's Elite winner: (Japan) Kohei Tsubaki
    - Women's Elite winner: (Japan) Yuka Sato
  - September 20: 2015 Murakami ASTC Triathlon Asian Cup in Japan
    - Men's Elite winner: (South Korea) Heo Min-ho
    - Women's Elite winner: (Australia) Melinda Vernon
  - October 17: 2015 Changshou ASTC Triathlon Premium Asian Cup in (China) Chongqing
    - Men's Elite winner: (China) BAI Faquan
    - Women's Elite winner: (China) WANG Lianyuan
  - October 31 & November 1: 2015 Hong Kong ASTC Sprint Triathlon Asian Cup in Lantau Island
    - Men's Elite winner: (Israel) Ron Darmon
    - Women's Elite winner: (South Africa) Mari Rabie
  - November 28: 2015 Pariaman ASTC Triathlon Asian Cup in Indonesia (final)
    - Men's Elite winner: (Japan) Jumpei Furuya
    - Women's Elite winner: (Australia) Emma Jeffcoat

== Paratriathlon ==
- March 1 – September 20: 2015 ITU World Paratriathlon Events
  - March 1: 2015 Buffalo City ITU World Paratriathlon Event in South Africa
  - Note: There was no Women's PT3 event here.
    - Men's PT1 winner: (Italy) Giovanni Achenza
    - Men's PT2 winner: (France) Stéphane Bahier
    - Men's PT3 winner: (South Africa) Dylan da Silva
    - Men's PT4 winner: (France) Yannick Bourseaux
    - Men's PT5 winner: (Slovenia) Alen Kobilica
    - Women's PT1 winner: (Spain) Eva María Moral Pedrero (default)
    - Women's PT2 winner: (Spain) Rakel Mateo Uriarte (default)
    - Women's PT4 winner: (United Kingdom) Clare Cunningham
    - Women's PT5 winner: (United Kingdom) Rhiannon Henry
  - March 13: 2015 Sunshine Coast ITU World Paratriathlon Event in Australia
    - Men's PT1 winner: (Australia) Bill Chaffey
    - Men's PT2 winner: (Australia) Brant Garvey
    - Men's PT3 winner: (Australia) Justin Godfrey (default)
    - Men's PT4 winner: (Australia) Jack Swift
    - Men's PT5 winner: (Australia) Jonathan Goerlach
    - Women's PT1 winner: (Australia) Emily Tapp
    - Women's PT2 winner: (United States) Hailey Danisewicz
    - Women's PT3 winner: (Australia) Kerryn Harvey
    - Women's PT4 winner: (Australia) Claire Mclean
    - Women's PT5 winner: (Australia) Katie Kelly
  - May 1 – 3: 2015 Monterrey CAMTRI Triathlon American Championships in Mexico
    - Men's PT1 winner: (United States) Krige Schabort
    - Men's PT2 winner: (United States) Mark Barr
    - Men's PT3 winner: (Brazil) Roberto Carlos Silva
    - Men's PT4 winner: (Canada) Stefan Daniel
    - Men's PT5 winner: (United States) Aaron Scheidies
    - Women's PT1 winner: (United States) Kendall Gretsch
    - Women's PT2 winner: (United States) Hailey Danisewicz
    - Women's PT3 winner: (Brazil) Fernanda Katheline Pereira (default)
    - Women's PT4 winner: (Canada) Chantal Givens
    - Women's PT5 winner: (United States) Patricia Walsh
  - May 10: 2015 Madrid ITU World Paratriathlon Event in Spain
    - Men's PT1 winner: (Netherlands) Jetze Plat
    - Men's PT2 winner: (Russia) Vasily Egorov
    - Men's PT3 winner: (Spain) Daniel Molina
    - Men's PT4 winner: (Germany) Martin Schulz
    - Men's PT5 winner: (Slovenia) Alen Kobilica
    - Women's PT1 winner: (Italy) Rita Cuccuru (default)
    - Women's PT2 winner: (France) Elise Marc
    - Women's PT3 winner: (Germany) Nora Hansel (default)
    - Women's PT4 winner: (France) Gwladys Lemoussu
    - Women's PT5 winner: (Spain) Susana Rodriguez
  - May 16: 2015 Yokohama ITU World Paratriathlon Event (held in conjunction with that city's World Triathlon Series event)
  - Note: There was no Women's PT3 event here.
    - Men's PT1 winner: (United States) Krige Schabort
    - Men's PT2 winner: (United States) Mark Barr
    - Men's PT3 winner: (Russia) Denis Kungurtcev
    - Men's PT4 winner: (Russia) Alexander Yalchik
    - Men's PT5 winner: (Poland) Łukasz Wietecki
    - Women's PT1 winner: (Australia) Emily Tapp (default)
    - Women's PT2 winner: (Japan) Yukako Hata
    - Women's PT4 winner: (Australia) Kate Doughty
    - Women's PT5 winner: (Australia) Katie Kelly
  - May 30: 2015 London ITU World Paratriathlon Event (held in conjunction with that city's World Triathlon Series event)
  - Note: There was no Women's PT3 event here.
    - Men's PT1 winner: (Australia) Bill Chaffey
    - Men's PT2 winner: (Italy) Michele Ferrarin
    - Men's PT3 winner: (Spain) Alejandro Sánchez Palomero
    - Men's PT4 winner: (Canada) Stefan Daniel
    - Men's PT5 winner: (Poland) Łukasz Wietecki
    - Women's PT1 winner: (United States) Mary Catherine Callahan
    - Women's PT2 winner: (Netherlands) Saskia van den Ouden
    - Women's PT4 winner: (United Kingdom) Lauren Steadman
    - Women's PT5 winner: (United Kingdom) Melissa Reid
  - June 7: 2015 Besançon ITU World Paratriathlon Event in France
  - Note: There was no Women's PT3 and PT4 events here.
    - Men's PT1 winner: (Netherlands) Geert Schipper
    - Men's PT2 winner: (Germany) Stefan Loesler
    - Men's PT3 winner: (Italy) Alessio Borgato
    - Men's PT4 winner: (France) Yannick Bourseaux
    - Men's PT5 winner: (Ukraine) Vasyl Zakrevskyi
    - Women's PT1 winner: (Italy) Rita Cuccuru (default)
    - Women's PT2 winner: (France) Elise Marc
    - Women's PT5 winner: (United Kingdom) Alison Patrick
  - July 18: 2015 Iseo – Franciacorta ITU World Paratriathlon Event in Italy
  - Note: There was no Women's PT3 event here.
    - Men's PT1 winner: (Netherlands) Geert Schipper
    - Men's PT2 winner: (Russia) Vasily Egorov
    - Men's PT3 winner: (Austria) Oliver Dreier
    - Men's PT4 winner: (Germany) Martin Schulz
    - Men's PT5 winner: (France) Arnaud Grandjean
    - Women's PT1 winner: (United Kingdom) Lizzie Tench
    - Women's PT2 winner: (Netherlands) Saskia van den Ouden
    - Women's PT4 winner: (France) Gwladys Lemoussu
    - Women's PT5 winner: (Australia) Katie Kelly
  - August 1: 2015 Rio de Janeiro ITU World Paratriathlon Event in Brazil (Paralympic Test Event)
  - Note: There was no Women's PT1 and PT3 events here.
    - Men's PT1 winner: (Australia) Bill Chaffey
    - Men's PT2 winner: (Russia) Vasily Egorov
    - Men's PT3 winner: (Brazil) Jorge Luis Fonseca
    - Men's PT4 winner: (Germany) Martin Schulz
    - Men's PT5 winner: (Spain) Jose Luis García Serrano
    - Women's PT2 winner: (United States) Hailey Danisewicz
    - Women's PT4 winner: (United Kingdom) Lauren Steadman
    - Women's PT5 winner: (United Kingdom) Alison Patrick
  - August 16: 2015 Detroit ITU World Paratriathlon Event in the United States
    - Men's PT1 winner: (Brazil) Fernando Aranha
    - Men's PT2 winner: (United Kingdom) Ryan Taylor
    - Men's PT3 winner: (United States) Andre Cilliers
    - Men's PT4 winner: (United States) Chris Hammer
    - Men's PT5 winner: (United States) Aaron Scheidies
    - Women's PT1 winner: (United States) Kendall Gretsch
    - Women's PT2 winner: (United States) Melissa Stockwell
    - Women's PT3 winner: (United States) Andrea Walton (default)
    - Women's PT4 winner: (United Kingdom) Clare Cunningham
    - Women's PT5 winner: (United States) Patricia Walsh
  - August 16: 2015 Subic Bay ASTC Paratriathlon Asian Championships in the Philippines
  - Note: There was no Women's PT1 to PT4 events here.
    - Men's PT1 winner: (Japan) Junpei Kimura
    - Men's PT2 winner: (Japan) Kenshiro Nakayama
    - Men's PT3 winner: (Japan) Hideki Uda
    - Men's PT4 winner: (Japan) Keiichi Sato
    - Men's PT5 winner: (Japan) Ryu Nakazawa
    - Women's PT5 winner: (Japan) Atsuko Yamada (default)
  - September 5 & 6: 2015 Edmonton ITU World Paratriathlon Event (in conjunction with that city's World Triathlon Series event)
  - Note: There was no Women's PT1 event here.
    - Men's PT1 winner: (Italy) Giovanni Achenza
    - Men's PT2 winner: (Morocco) Mohamed Lahna
    - Men's PT3 winner: (United States) Andre Cilliers
    - Men's PT4 winner: (Canada) Stefan Daniel
    - Men's PT5 winner: (Canada) Lowell Taylor (default)
    - Women's PT2 winner: (United States) Allysa Seely
    - Women's PT3 winner: (United States) Andrea Walton (default)
    - Women's PT4 winner: (United States) Patricia Collins
    - Women's PT5 winner: (United States) Amy Dixon
  - September 15 – 20: 2015 Chicago ITU World Paratriathlon Championships (held in conjunction with that city's World Triathlon Series Grand Final)
    - Men's PT1 winner: (Australia) Bill Chaffey
    - Men's PT2 winner: (Italy) Michele Ferrarin
    - Men's PT3 winner: (Austria) Oliver Dreier
    - Men's PT4 winner: (Canada) Stefan Daniel
    - Men's PT5 winner: (United States) Aaron Scheidies
    - Women's PT1 winner: (United States) Kendall Gretsch
    - Women's PT2 winner: (United States) Allysa Seely
    - Women's PT3 winner: (Australia) Sally Pilbeam
    - Women's PT4 winner: (United Kingdom) Lauren Steadman
    - Women's PT5 winner: (Australia) Katie Kelly

== Other triathlon events ==
- March 7: 2015 João Pessoa CAMTRI Triathlon Junior South American Championships in Brazil
  - Junior Men's winner: (Brazil) Manoel Messias
  - Junior Women's winner: (Brazil) Barbara Santos
- March 14: 2015 Sarasota CAMTRI Triathlon Junior North American Championships in the United States
  - Junior Men's winner: (United States) Austin Hindman
  - Junior Women's winner: (Canada) Emy Legault
- March 14 & 15: 2015 Sarasota CAMTRI Triathlon Mixed Relay American and Caribbean Championships in the United States
  - 4 x Mixed Relay winners: Canada (Emy Legault, John Rasmussen, Dominika Jamnicky, and Jeremy Briand)
- April 18: 2015 Puerto San José CAMTRI Triathlon Junior Central American and Caribbean Championships in Guatemala
  - Junior Men's winner: (Panama) Peter Vega
  - Junior Women's winner: (El Salvador) Giovanna Michelle Gonzalez Miranda
- May 9 & 10: 2015 Sharm el-Sheikh ATU Triathlon African Championships and Pan Arab Championships in Egypt
  - Men's Elite winner: (South Africa) Henri Schoeman
  - Women's Elite winner: (South Africa) Gillian Sanders
  - Junior Men's winner: (South Africa) Nicholas Quenet
  - Junior Women's winner: (South Africa) Giselde Strauss
- June 6: 2015 Kupiškis ETU Triathlon Baltic Championships in Lithuania
  - Men's Elite winner: (Belarus) Aliaksandr Vasilevich
  - Women's Elite winner: (Sweden) Amanda Bohlin
- June 11 – 14: 2015 New Taipei ASTC Triathlon Asian Championships in Chinese Taipei
  - Men's Elite winner: (Japan) Yuichi Hosoda
  - Women's Elite winner: (Japan) Ai Ueda
  - Junior Men's winner: (Hong Kong) KOK Yu Hang
  - Junior Women's winner: (South Korea) JEONG Hye-rim
- June 27: 2015 ETU Aquathlon European Championships in (Germany) Cologne
  - Men's Elite winner: (Czech Republic) Tomáš Svoboda
  - Women's Elite winner: (United Kingdom) Hannah Kitchen
  - Junior Men's winner: (Slovenia) Urh Klenovšek
  - Junior Women's winner: (Czech Republic) Simona Simunkova
- July 9 – 12: 2015 ETU European Triathlon Championships in (Switzerland) Geneva
  - Men's Elite winner: (France) David Hauss
  - Women's Elite winner: (Switzerland) Nicola Spirig
  - Junior Men's winner: (Germany) Lasse Lührs
  - Junior Women's winner: (Germany) Laura Lindemann
- July 18 & 19: 2015 ITU Triathlon Mixed Relay World Championships in (Germany) Hamburg
  - 4 x Mixed Relay winners: France (Jeanne Lehair, Dorian Coninx, Audrey Merle, and Vincent Luis)
- July 25 & 26: 2015 ETU Triathlon U23 & Youth European Championships in (Spain) Banyoles
  - Men's U23 winner: (Spain) David Castro Fajardo
  - Women's U23 winner: (United Kingdom) Lucy Hall
  - Men's Youth Team Relay winners: Great Britain (Cameron Harris, Alex Chantler Mayne, Ben Dijkstra)
  - Women's Youth Team Relay winners: Russia (Maria Tchuiko, Elizaveta Zhizhina, Ekaterina Matyukh)
  - 4 x Mixed Relay U23 winners: Italy (Ilaria Zane, Riccardo de Palma, Angelica Olmo, Delian Stateff)
- August 2: 2015 Rio de Janeiro ITU World Olympic Qualification Event in Brazil (Olympic Test Event)
  - Men's Elite winner: (Spain) Francisco Javier Gómez Noya
  - Women's Elite winner: (United States) Gwen Jorgensen
