= Triathlon at the 2014 Asian Games – Mixed relay =

Mixed relay at the 2014 Asian Games
- Venue: Songdo Central Park
- Date: 26 September 2014
- Competitors: 48 from 12 nations

Medalists
gold medal	Japan; Yuka Sato, Hirokatsu Tayama, Ai Ueda, Yuichi Hosoda
silver medal	South Korea; Jeong Hye-rim, Heo Min-ho, Kim Gyu-ri, Kim Ji-hwan
bronze medal	China; Xin Lingxi, Duan Zhengyu, Huang Yuting, Bai Faquan

The mixed relay triathlon was part of the Triathlon at the 2014 Asian Games program, was held in Songdo Central Park Triathlon Venue on September 26, 2014.

The race was held in four legs each one consisted of 250 metres (0.16 mi) swimming, 6.6 kilometres (4.1 mi) road bicycle racing, and 1.6 kilometres (1.0 mi) road running.

== Schedule ==
All times are Korea Standard Time (UTC+09:00)

Date	Time	Event
Friday, 26 September 2014	15:00	Final

== Results ==
Rank	Team	Swim 250 m	Trans. 1	Bike 6.6 km	Trans. 2	Run 1.6 km	Total time
1st place, gold medalist(s)	Japan (JPN)						1:17:28
	Yuka Sato	3:19	0:31	10:34	0:24	4:58	19:46
	Hirokatsu Tayama	3:23	0:30	10:05	0:21	4:20	18:39
	Ai Ueda	4:01	0:28	10:55	0:24	4:43	20:31
	Yuichi Hosoda	3:17	0:28	9:31	0:23	4:53	18:32
2nd place, silver medalist(s)	South Korea (KOR)						1:18:39
	Jeong Hye-rim	3:30	0:32	10:39	0:22	4:58	20:01
	Heo Min-ho	3:22	0:26	9:55	0:19	4:23	18:25
	Kim Gyu-ri	4:01	0:31	10:51	0:22	5:15	21:00
	Kim Ji-hwan	3:23	0:24	10:09	0:21	4:56	19:13
3rd place, bronze medalist(s)	China (CHN)						1:19:16
	Xin Lingxi	3:30	0:30	10:39	0:23	5:13	20:15
	Duan Zhengyu	3:26	0:27	10:22	0:23	4:30	19:08
	Huang Yuting	3:50	0:31	10:29	0:27	5:16	20:33
	Bai Faquan	3:25	0:30	10:06	0:25	4:54	19:20
4	Hong Kong (HKG)						1:20:42
	Hilda Choi	3:43	0:27	10:47	0:20	5:10	20:27
	Perry Wong	3:17	0:26	10:22	0:23	4:35	19:03
	Joyce Cheung	3:58	0:27	11:10	0:21	5:30	21:26
	Ivan Lo	3:36	0:29	10:29	0:24	4:48	19:46
5	Kazakhstan (KAZ)						1:24:23
	Karolina Solovyova	3:49	0:32	11:54	0:26	5:24	22:05
	Valentin Meshcheryakov	3:22	0:27	10:02	0:25	4:35	18:51
	Oxana Grot	4:21	0:32	12:33	0:26	5:29	23:21
	Temirlan Temirov	3:32	0:28	10:47	0:23	4:56	20:06
6	Philippines (PHI)						1:25:39
	Maria Claire Adorna	3:27	0:38	10:54	0:24	5:52	21:15
	Nikko Huelgas	4:03	0:26	10:25	0:25	4:59	20:18
	Kim Mangrobang	4:04	0:31	12:19	0:27	5:33	22:54
	John Chicano	4:05	0:28	10:46	0:25	5:28	21:12
7	Macau (MAC)						1:27:57
	Hoi Long	3:52	0:30	10:36	0:22	5:15	20:35
	Chao Man Kit	3:32	0:31	11:08	0:25	5:37	21:13
	Lei Cho Ieng	4:42	0:35	12:58	0:26	6:59	25:40
	Kuok Chi Wai	3:58	0:28	10:41	0:23	4:59	20:29
8	Uzbekistan (UZB)						1:28:07
	Alina Khakimova	4:16	0:32	11:33	0:25	6:07	22:53
	Dmitriy Zaytsev	3:43	0:27	11:28	0:24	4:56	20:58
	Zukhra Vakhitova	4:45	0:33	12:13	0:26	6:09	24:06
	Shohrukh Yunusov	3:34	0:29	10:35	0:24	5:08	20:10
9	Thailand (THA)						1:32:34
	Kamolchanok Kornkaew	3:56	0:30	12:11	0:24	6:15	23:16
	Wutthiwat Hemwet	3:40	0:33	11:52	0:27	5:52	22:24
	Nichapat Kaewma	4:22	0:30	12:13	0:25	6:36	24:06
	Phu Sampuranaphan	4:10	0:30	11:56	0:20	5:52	22:48
10	Nepal (NEP)						1:37:24
	Yam Kumari Ghale	4:47	0:45	12:42	0:31	6:56	25:41
	Basant Tharu	4:40	0:38	11:25	0:18	5:00	22:01
	Keshari Thapa Magar	6:09	0:46	13:29	0:22	6:33	27:19
	Rudra Bahadur Katuwal	4:07	0:38	11:34	0:17	5:47	22:23
11	Kuwait (KUW)						1:37:27
	Najlaa Al-Jerewi	4:52	0:45	12:28	0:27	6:36	25:08
	Ali Al-Rakhis	4:11	0:37	11:41	0:31	6:18	23:18
	Nada Al-Jerewi	6:04	1:21	13:10	0:30	6:53	27:58
	Jafar Al-Ali	4:27	0:28	10:14	0:24	5:30	21:03
12	Mongolia (MGL)						1:37:31
	Tüvshintögsiin Khüslen	4:09	0:45	12:51	0:22	6:51	24:58
	Noojiin Temüülen	3:41	0:30	11:51	0:26	5:54	22:22
	Erdenebilegiin Sürennyam	4:39	0:46	13:32	0:23	7:19	26:39
	Chuluunsükhiin Gansükh	4:34	0:34	11:40	0:24	6:20	23:32
