= Triathlon at the 2014 Asian Games – Men's individual =

Men's individual at the 2014 Asian Games
- Venue: Songdo Central Park
- Date: 25 September 2014
- Competitors: 23 from 14 nations

Medalists
gold medal	Yuichi Hosoda	Japan
silver medal	Hirokatsu Tayama	Japan
bronze medal	Bai Faquan	China

The men's triathlon was part of the Triathlon at the 2014 Asian Games program, was held in Songdo Central Park Triathlon Venue on September 25, 2014.

The race was held over the "international distance" and consisted of 1,500 metres (0.93 mi) swimming, 39.6 kilometres (24.6 mi) road bicycle racing, and 10 kilometres (6.2 mi) road running.

== Schedule ==
All times are Korea Standard Time (UTC+09:00)

Date	Time	Event
Thursday, 25 September 2014	14:00	Final

== Results ==
Legend

- DNF — Did not finish

Rank	Athlete	Swim 1.5 km	Trans. 1	Bike 39.6 km	Trans. 2	Run 10 km	Total time
1st place, gold medalist(s)	Yuichi Hosoda (JPN)	17:53	0:27	59:02	0:25	31:24	1:49:11
2nd place, silver medalist(s)	Hirokatsu Tayama (JPN)	17:51	0:27	59:03	0:22	31:41	1:49:24
3rd place, bronze medalist(s)	Bai Faquan (CHN)	17:57	0:28	58:57	0:22	31:57	1:49:41
4	Valentin Meshcheryakov (KAZ)	17:56	0:29	58:50	0:25	33:24	1:51:04
5	Xu Zheng (CHN)	17:49	0:30	59:03	0:22	33:39	1:51:23
6	Kim Ji-hwan (KOR)	17:59	0:28	58:54	0:23	34:09	1:51:53
7	Lawrence Fanous (JOR)	17:55	0:26	59:00	0:20	35:01	1:52:42
8	Wong Hui Wai (HKG)	17:58	0:26	58:59	0:22	37:32	1:55:17
9	Ayan Beisenbayev (KAZ)	19:14	0:29	1:01:16	0:31	35:39	1:57:09
10	Jonard Saim (PHI)	21:13	0:29	1:00:31	0:22	36:25	1:59:00
11	Nikko Huelgas (PHI)	21:08	0:35	1:00:29	0:34	36:31	1:59:17
12	Thanongsak Manchai (THA)	21:10	0:31	1:00:33	0:26	37:58	2:00:38
13	Shohrukh Yunusov (UZB)	19:21	0:29	1:02:21	0:24	40:29	2:03:04
14	Kuok Chi Wai (MAC)	21:12	0:28	1:00:35	0:22	41:02	2:03:39
15	Rogério Carreira (MAC)	22:28	0:32	1:02:38	0:28	41:29	2:07:35
16	Jafar Al-Ali (KUW)	23:46	0:30	1:01:23	0:32	42:05	2:08:16
17	Mohamed Al-Qais (BRN)	28:46	0:32	1:03:46	0:36	37:18	2:10:58
18	Nawaf Al-Dhaen (BRN)	24:55	0:58	1:05:32	0:51	40:49	2:13:05
19	Javohir Yunusov (UZB)	19:53	0:34	1:01:47	0:32	50:47	2:13:33
20	Saleh Al-Duwaisan (KUW)	25:37	0:35	1:04:09	0:26	43:15	2:14:02
—	Samir Hajazi (SYR)	19:51	0:33	1:05:18	0:44		DNF
—	Heo Min-ho (KOR)	19:18	0:27				DNF
—	Noojiin Temüülen (MGL)	21:12	0:33				DNF
