= Triathlon at the 2014 Asian Games =

- Venue: Songdo Central Park
- Dates: 25–26 September 2014
- Competitors: 65 from 15 nations

Triathlon at the 2014 Asian Games was held at the Songdo Central Park, Incheon, South Korea from September 25 to 26, 2014. Both men and women competed in individual events, plus a mixed-gendered relay event.

The individual triathlon contains three components: a 1.5 km (0.93 mi) swim, 40 km (25 mi) cycle, and a 10 km (6.2 mi) run. The relay event features teams of four competitors, where each completes a 250 m (0.16 mi) swim, a 6.6 km (4.1 mi) cycle, and a 1.6 km (1.0 mi) run.

== Schedule ==
F	Final

Event↓/Date →	25th Thu	26th Fri
Men's individual	F	
Women's individual	F	
Mixed relay		F

== Medalists ==
Event	Gold	Silver	Bronze
Men's individual	Yuichi Hosoda; Japan	Hirokatsu Tayama; Japan	Bai Faquan; China
Women's individual	Ai Ueda; Japan	Juri Ide; Japan	Wang Lianyuan; China
Mixed relay	Japan; Yuka Sato; Hirokatsu Tayama; Ai Ueda; Yuichi Hosoda	South Korea; Jeong Hye-rim; Heo Min-ho; Kim Gyu-ri; Kim Ji-hwan	China; Xin Lingxi; Duan Zhengyu; Huang Yuting; Bai Faquan

== Medal table ==
Rank	Nation	Gold	Silver	Bronze	Total
1	Japan (JPN)	3	2	0	5
2	South Korea (KOR)	0	1	0	1
3	China (CHN)	0	0	3	3
Totals (3 entries)		3	3	3	9

== Participating nations ==
A total of 65 athletes from 15 nations competed in triathlon at the 2014 Asian Games:

- Bahrain (2)
- China (6)
- Hong Kong (6)
- Japan (5)
- Jordan (1)
- Kazakhstan (5)
- Kuwait (5)
- Macau (5)
- Mongolia (4)
- Nepal (4)
- Philippines (5)
- South Korea (5)
- Syria (1)
- Thailand (6)
- Uzbekistan (5)
