= Triathlon at the 2010 Asian Games – Men's individual =

Men's individual at the 2010 Asian Games
- Venue: Guangzhou Triathlon Venue
- Date: 14 November 2010
- Competitors: 21 from 12 nations

Medalists
gold medal	Yuichi Hosoda	Japan
silver medal	Ryosuke Yamamoto	Japan
bronze medal	Dmitriy Gaag	Kazakhstan

The men's triathlon was part of the Triathlon at the 2010 Asian Games program, was held in Guangzhou Triathlon Venue on November 14, 2010.

The race was held over the "international distance" and consisted of 1,500 metres (0.93 mi) swimming, 40 kilometres (25 mi) road bicycle racing, and 10 kilometres (6.2 mi) road running.

== Schedule ==
All times are China Standard Time (UTC+08:00)

Date	Time	Event
Sunday, 14 November 2010	09:00	Final

== Results ==
Legend

- DNF — Did not finish
- DSQ — Disqualified

Rank	Athlete	Swim 1.5 km	Trans. 1	Bike 40 km	Trans. 2	Run 10 km	Total time
1st place, gold medalist(s)	Yuichi Hosoda (JPN)	19:04	1:05	1:00:04	0:36	31:25	1:52:15.56
2nd place, silver medalist(s)	Ryosuke Yamamoto (JPN)	19:02	1:06	1:00:05	0:37	31:48	1:52:41.49
3rd place, bronze medalist(s)	Dmitriy Gaag (KAZ)	19:12	1:06	59:56	0:39	32:12	1:53:08.21
4	Dmitriy Smurov (KAZ)	19:11	1:04	1:00:00	0:46	32:43	1:53:46.42
5	Heo Min-ho (KOR)	19:02	1:06	1:00:07	0:35	33:19	1:54:10.42
6	Kim Ju-seok (KOR)	19:16	1:03	59:55	0:42	33:33	1:54:31.19
7	Andrew Wright (HKG)	19:06	1:06	1:00:02	0:42	33:46	1:54:45.47
8	Daniel Lee (HKG)	19:16	1:01	59:57	0:41	33:49	1:54:46.29
9	Jiang Zhihang (CHN)	19:03	1:05	1:00:06	0:40	34:08	1:55:03.77
10	Sun Liwei (CHN)	20:23	1:08	1:01:03	0:41	32:07	1:55:24.02
11	Nikko Huelgas (PHI)	21:33	1:17	1:03:02	0:42	35:16	2:01:53.01
12	Antonio Lao (MAC)	20:23	1:14	1:00:57	0:49	38:28	2:01:54.21
13	Pavel Rastrigin (UZB)	21:31	1:20	1:03:01	0:44	37:08	2:03:45.75
14	Neil Catiil (PHI)	23:03	1:14	1:03:03	0:51	37:16	2:05:28.59
15	Shohrukh Yunusov (UZB)	19:08	1:16	1:03:56	1:03	40:36	2:06:02.53
16	Kuok Chi Wai (MAC)	23:05	1:11	1:06:37	0:42	37:50	2:09:27.75
17	Mohd Zuhar Ismail (MAS)	28:30	1:30	1:07:57	0:49	38:17	2:17:05.38
18	Wei Kuo Hau (MAS)	25:56	1:23	1:10:37	0:49	41:17	2:20:05.50
19	Chuluunsükhiin Gansükh (MGL)	25:07	1:26	1:09:51	1:18	1:01:00	2:38:44.85
—	Gurudatta Gharat (IND)	23:05	1:10	1:08:57	1:11		DNF
—	Mohammad Al-Sabbagh (SYR)	19:05	1:13	1:02:17	0:41		DSQ
