= Hirokatsu =

- Gender: Male

Origin
- Origin: Japanese
- Meaning: Different meanings depending on the kanji used

Hirokatsu (written: 博且, 博克 or 寛豪) is a masculine Japanese given name. Notable people with the name include:

- Hirokatsu Hashimoto (橋本 博且; born 1985), Japanese badminton player
- Hirokatsu Kuwayama (桑山 博克; born 1942), Japanese water polo player
- Hirokatsu Tayama (田山 寛豪; born 1981), Japanese triathlete
