= Triathlon at the 2014 Asian Games – Women's individual =

Women's individual at the 2014 Asian Games
- Venue: Songdo Central Park
- Date: 25 September 2014
- Competitors: 15 from 9 nations

Medalists
gold medal	Ai Ueda	Japan
silver medal	Juri Ide	Japan
bronze medal	Wang Lianyuan	China

The women's triathlon was part of the Triathlon at the 2014 Asian Games program, was held in Songdo Central Park Triathlon Venue on September 25, 2014.

The race was held over the "international distance" and consisted of 1,500 metres (0.93 mi) swimming, 39.6 kilometres (24.6 mi) road bicycle racing, and 10 kilometres (6.2 mi) road running.

== Schedule ==
All times are Korea Standard Time (UTC+09:00)

Date	Time	Event
Thursday, 25 September 2014	10:00	Final

== Results ==
Rank	Athlete	Swim 1.5 km	Trans. 1	Bike 39.6 km	Trans. 2	Run 10 km	Total time
1st place, gold medalist(s)	Ai Ueda (JPN)	20:07	0:30	1:05:58	0:24	34:48	2:01:47
2nd place, silver medalist(s)	Juri Ide (JPN)	20:06	0:30	1:05:58	0:22	36:11	2:03:07
3rd place, bronze medalist(s)	Wang Lianyuan (CHN)	20:05	0:34	1:05:59	0:34	36:01	2:03:13
4	Huang Yuting (CHN)	20:02	0:32	1:06:02	0:26	36:16	2:03:18
5	Hoi Long (MAC)	20:15	0:29	1:05:52	0:23	36:21	2:03:20
6	Jo A-reum (KOR)	19:30	0:34	1:06:35	0:26	39:50	2:06:55
7	Maria Claire Adorna (PHI)	20:09	0:34	1:05:57	0:26	41:59	2:09:05
8	Leanne Szeto (HKG)	21:48	0:29	1:07:48	0:26	39:44	2:10:15
9	Kim Mangrobang (PHI)	20:21	0:30	1:09:15	0:24	42:48	2:13:18
10	Karolina Solovyova (KAZ)	22:24	0:30	1:14:38	0:31	41:12	2:19:15
11	Zukhra Vakhitova (UZB)	25:51	0:31	1:11:11	0:31	47:47	2:25:51
12	Sanruthai Arunsiri (THA)	20:13	0:37	1:14:09	0:30	51:14	2:26:43
13	Alina Khakimova (UZB)	24:36	0:33	1:14:29	0:30	46:44	2:26:52
14	Lei Cho Ieng (MAC)	24:47	0:38	1:15:48	0:32	53:07	2:34:52
15	Najlaa Al-Jerewi (KUW)	28:35	1:34	1:15:55	0:29	48:46	2:35:19
