= Triathlon at the 2010 Asian Games =

- Venue: Guangzhou Triathlon Venue
- Dates: 13–14 November 2010
- Competitors: 32 from 12 nations

Triathlon at the 2010 Asian Games was held in Guangzhou, China from November 13 to 14, 2010. Both men and women competed on the Guangzhou Triathlon Venue.

The triathlon contains three components; a 1.5 kilometers (0.93 mi) swim, 40 kilometers (25 mi) cycle, and a 10 kilometers (6.2 mi) run.

== Schedule ==
F	Final

Event↓/Date →	13th Sat	14th Sun
Men's individual		F
Women's individual	F	

== Medalists ==
Event	Gold	Silver	Bronze
Men's individual	Yuichi Hosoda; Japan	Ryosuke Yamamoto; Japan	Dmitriy Gaag; Kazakhstan
Women's individual	Mariko Adachi; Japan	Akane Tsuchihashi; Japan	Jang Yun-jung; South Korea

== Medal table ==
Rank	Nation	Gold	Silver	Bronze	Total
1	Japan (JPN)	2	2	0	4
2	Kazakhstan (KAZ)	0	0	1	1
2	South Korea (KOR)	0	0	1	1
Totals (3 entries)		2	2	2	6

== Participating nations ==
A total of 32 athletes from 12 nations competed in triathlon at the 2010 Asian Games:

- China (4)
- Hong Kong (2)
- India (2)
- Japan (4)
- Kazakhstan (4)
- Macau (3)
- Malaysia (2)
- Mongolia (2)
- Philippines (2)
- South Korea (4)
- Syria (1)
- Uzbekistan (2)
