= Triathlon at the 2010 Asian Games – Women's individual =

Women's individual at the 2010 Asian Games
- Venue: Guangzhou Triathlon Venue
- Date: 13 November 2010
- Competitors: 11 from 7 nations

Medalists
gold medal	Mariko Adachi	Japan
silver medal	Akane Tsuchihashi	Japan
bronze medal	Jang Yun-jung	South Korea

The women's triathlon was part of the Triathlon at the 2010 Asian Games program, was held in Guangzhou Triathlon Venue on November 13, 2010.

The race was held over the "international distance" and consisted of 1,500 metres (0.93 mi) swimming, 40 kilometres (25 mi) road bicycle racing, and 10 kilometres (6.2 mi) road running.

== Schedule ==
All times are China Standard Time (UTC+08:00)

Date	Time	Event
Saturday, 13 November 2010	09:00	Final

== Results ==
Rank	Athlete	Swim 1.5 km	Trans. 1	Bike 40 km	Trans. 2	Run 10 km	Total time
1st place, gold medalist(s)	Mariko Adachi (JPN)	19:35	1:18	1:08:27	0:46	35:37	2:05:44.59
2nd place, silver medalist(s)	Akane Tsuchihashi (JPN)	19:37	1:16	1:08:27	0:45	36:24	2:06:31.56
3rd place, bronze medalist(s)	Jang Yun-jung (KOR)	19:58	1:12	1:08:08	0:43	37:48	2:07:52.50
4	Hoi Long (MAC)	21:53	1:13	1:06:14	0:49	38:10	2:08:21.37
5	Fan Dan (CHN)	20:00	1:12	1:08:07	0:45	38:41	2:08:47.74
6	Liu Ting (CHN)	21:26	1:18	1:06:36	0:48	39:04	2:09:15.11
7	Hong Dan-bi (KOR)	19:58	1:15	1:08:09	0:47	40:32	2:10:43.46
8	Yekaterina Shatnaya (KAZ)	24:08	1:19	1:10:18	0:52	38:55	2:15:33.29
9	Karolina Solovyova (KAZ)	23:10	1:19	1:11:16	0:55	44:06	2:20:47.88
10	Pooja Chaurushi (IND)	22:53	1:31	1:18:02	0:56	47:42	2:31:07.10
11	Tüvshinjargalyn Enkhjargal (MGL)	24:10	1:30	1:21:31	0:58	53:44	2:41:56.04
