= Ryosuke Yamamoto (triathlete) =

Japanese triathlete

Personal information
- Nationality: Japan
- Born: May 17, 1979 (age 47)
- Height: 1.78 m (5 ft 10 in)
- Weight: 67 kg (148 lb)

Sport
- Team: Toyota Body
Medal record
Triathlon
Representing Japan
Asian Games
Silver medal – second place	2010 Guangzhou	Men's competition

Ryosuke Yamamoto (山本 良介, Yamamoto Ryōsuke; born May 17, 1979 in Kyoto) is a Japanese triathlete, who has taken part in numerous triathlon championships. At the peak of his career, he has won eight championship titles, including four from the ITC Triathlon Asian Cup. His best international result happened in 2010, when he finished third at the ITC World Cup in Ishigaki, Japan.

Yamamoto was selected to the Japanese national triathlon team, along with his teammate Hirokatsu Tayama, at the 2008 Summer Olympics in Beijing. He finished only in thirtieth place in men's triathlon, with a time of 1:52:11. Despite his disappointing finish at the Olympics, Yamamoto was able to complete a two-spot medal sweep for Japan at the 2010 Asian Games in Guangzhou, China, when he claimed silver in the men's triathlon, just behind his compatriot Yuichi Hosoda by twenty-six hundredths of a second.
