= Nikko Huelgas =

Filipino triathlete (born 1991)

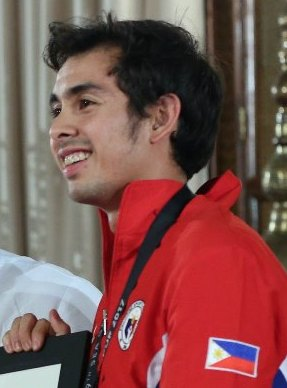
- Huelgas in 2017

Personal information
- Born: July 19, 1991 (age 35)
- Home town: Las Piñas, Metro Manila
- Occupations: triathlete, commercial model, motivational speaker, sports executive
- Years active: 2009–

Sport
- Country: Philippines
- Sport: Triathlon
- University team: DLSU Green Tankers (swimming)
Medal record
Representing the Philippines
Men's triathlon
Southeast Asian Games
Gold medal – first place	2017 Kuala Lumpur	Triathlon
Gold medal – first place	2015 Singapore	Triathlon

Nikko Bryan Huelgas (born July 19, 1991) is a retired Filipino professional triathlete who competed internationally. He currently functions as the Marketing Head of the Philippine Olympic Committee (POC). He is the first Filipino to win a gold medal in the men's individual triathlon event at the Southeast Asian Games securing the feat in the 2015 edition. He also successfully defended his title at the 2017 Southeast Asian Games.

He is currently the captain of the Philippine National Triathlon team. He is a member of the Philippine Olympic Committee (POC) Athletes’ Commission serving as their chairman. He also has a seat on the POC's executive board.

During his college days, he used to represent the varsity swimming and track and field team for De La Salle University in the UAAP.

== Education ==
Huelgas studied at the Elizabeth Seton School in Las Piñas for his high school studies. For his collegiate studies, Huelgas attended the De La Salle University where he obtained a Bachelor of Science in Marketing degree in 2014.

== Youth career ==
Huelgas was part co-captain of the swimming team of his high school, Elizabeth Seton School, and was also a member of the school's water polo team. He was also the captain of the school's badminton team.

He was a member of the collegiate swimming team of his alma mater, the De La Salle University (DLSU). His shift to triathlon began when he took part in a 5k fun run in January 2009 where coach Rick Reyes of the Triathlon Association of the Philippines (TRAP) scouted him and thereafter invited him to join an aquathlon. Huelgas bought his first bicycle in May of the same year and began participating in triathlons. He then also joined the DLSU track and field team in 2010, where he competed in the long-distance run events. In January 2010, he qualified for the pool of the triathlon and water polo national teams, but chose to pursue a triathlon career.

== Professional career ==
Huelgas made his professional triathlon debut under the Junior Men division during the 2010 Subic Bay ASTC Triathlon U23 and Junior Asian Championships in May 2010. He made his official debut in the Elite Men category shortly, particularly September of the same year, at the 2010 Yilan ITU Triathlon Cup.

At age 19, he placed his studies on hold to train in Subic for the 2010 Asian Games.

Since then, he has been competing consistently at local and international triathlon competitions. In September 2014, he represented the Philippines as part of national triathlon team in the Incheon Asian Games. There, he secured an 11th-place finish in the Elite Men's category and 6th in the Mixed Relay category.

Huelgas made history on June 7, 2015, when he became the first Filipino professional triathlete to win the gold medal in the 28th Southeast Asian Games, which was held in Singapore. He finished the race with a time of two hours, four minutes, and 32 seconds, one minute and three seconds.

On August 7, 2017, Huelgas made history once again when he successful defended his gold medal at the 29th Southeast Asian Games, clocking in at one hour, fifty-nine minutes and twenty one seconds.

He participated in the 2018 Asian Games in Indonesia where he placed 16th place and suffered a left hand fracture from a bicycle accident which caused him to be sidelined from competitive sports in early 2019. This led to his non-inclusion to the Philippines' roster for triathlon in the 2019 Southeast Asian Games to be hosted at home due to failing to be among the best two performers in the qualifying events. Huelgas is still scheduled to take part as part in the games of the mixed relay team.

== ITU competitions ==
The following list is based upon the official ITU rankings and the Athlete's Profile Page. Unless indicated otherwise, the following events are triathlons (Olympic Distance) and belong to the Elite category.

Date	Competition	Place	Rank
May 10, 2010	Subic Bay ASTC Triathlon U23 and Junior Asian Championships (Junior)	Subic Bay	20
September 19, 2010	Yilan ITU Triathlon Asian Cup	Yilan	11
October 23, 2010	Hong Kong ITU Triathlon Asian Cup	Hong Kong	33
November 13, 2010	Asian Games	Guangzhou	11
December 16, 2010	Asian Beach Games	Muscat	10
May 1, 2011	Subic Bay ITU Triathlon Asian Cup	Subic Bay	23
July 31, 2011	Singapore ITU Triathlon Asian Cup	Singapore	15
September 10, 2011	Dextro Energy Triathlon - ITU World Championship Grand Final (U23)	Beijing	DNF
September 24, 2011	Yilan ASTC Triathlon Asian Championships (U23)	Yilan	7
April 7, 2012	Tateyama ASTC Triathlon Asian Championships (U23)	Tateyama	7
June 30, 2012	Yilan FISU World University Triathlon Championships	Yilan	40
September 8, 2012	Chengdu ITU Triathlon Premium Asian Cup	Chengdu	34
September 22, 2012	Yilan ITU Triathlon Asian Cup	Chengdu	6
October 20, 2012	Barfoot and Thompson World Triathlon Grand Final (U23)	Auckland	DNF
November 25, 2012	Subic Bay ASTC Duathlon Asian Championships (U23)	Subic Bay	3
April 27, 2013	Subic Bay ASTC Triathlon Asian Championships (U23)	Subic Bay	17
April 29, 2013	Subic Bay ASTC Triathlon Asian Championships (Mixed Relay)	Subic Bay	DNF
May 1, 2013	PHI Triathlon National Championships		3
October 26, 2013	Lantau ITU Triathlon Asian Cup	Hong Kong	22
April 26, 2014	Subic Bay ASTC Triathlon Asian Cup	Subic Bay	10
May 25, 2014	PHI Sprint Triathlon National Championships	Muntinlupa	1
August 16, 2014	Singapore ASTC Triathlon Asian Cup	Muntinlupa	DNF
September 25, 2014	Asian Games	Incheon	11
September 26, 2014	Asian Games (Mixed Relay)	Incheon	6
October 25, 2014	Hong Kong ASTC Triathlon Asian Cup	Hong Kong	15
October 25, 2014	Hong Kong ASTC Triathlon U23 Asian Championships (U23)	Hong Kong	5
November 16, 2014	Asian Beach Games (Mixed Relay)	Phuket	7
November 20, 2014	Asian Beach Games	Phuket	15
March 21, 2015	Quarteira ETU Triathlon European Cup	Quarteira	50
April 19, 2015	Melilla ETU Triathlon European Cup	Melilla	42
May 10, 2015	Madrid ETU Triathlon European Cup	Madrid	DNF
June 7, 2015	Southeast Asian Games	Singapore	1
June 12, 2015	New Taipei ASTC Triathlon Asian Championships	New Taipei	8
October 24, 2015	Tongyeong ITU Triathlon World Cup	Tongyeong	DSQ
April 2, 2016	Quarteira ETU Triathlon European Cup	Quarteira	64
April 30, 2016	Hatsukaichi ASTC Triathlon Asian Championships	Hatsukaichi	19
May 1, 2016	Hatsukaichi ASTC Triathlon Asian Championships (Mixed Relay)	Hatsukaichi	6
June 5, 2016	New Taipei City ASTC Triathlon Asian Cup and Strait Cup	New Taipei	8
October 22, 2016	Tongyeong ITU Triathlon World Cup	Tongyeong	67
October 29, 2016	Miyazaki ITU Triathlon World Cup	Miyazaki	LAP
April 30, 2017	Subic Bay NTT ASTC Triathlon Asian Cup	Subic Bay	21
July 22, 2017	Palembang ASTC Triathlon Asian Championships	Palembang	16
August 21, 2017	Southeast Asian Games	Kuala Lumpur	1
March 24, 2018	Quarteira ETU Triathlon European Cup	Quarteira	LAP
April 22, 2018	Subic Bay NTT ASTC Triathlon Asian Cup	Subic Bay	33
May 12, 2018	Gunsan Saemangeum ASTC Long Distance Triathlon Asian Championships	Gunsan/Saemangeum	6
June 17, 2018	Subic Bay ASTC Triathlon Southeast Championships	Subic Bay	8
August 12, 2018	Mt Mayon ASTC Triathlon Asian Cup	Legazpi	DNF
September 1, 2018	2018 Asian Games	Palembang	16
June 21, 2019	Gyeongju ASTC Triathlon Asian Championships	Gyeongju	26

Key: DNF = Did not finish; DNS = Did not start; U23 = Under 23

== Other ==
Aside from being a professional triathlete, Huelgas is also the chairman of the POC Athlete's Commission. He is also commercial model who has had campaigns for the likes of Skyflakes, Cherifer Premium, Samsung, Gatorade and USANA Philippines, and also serves as a motivational speaker.
