= Wang Lianyuan =

Chinese triathlete

Wang Lianyuan (born August 26, 1994) is a Chinese triathlete. She placed 48th in the women's triathlon at the 2016 Summer Olympics.

She won the bronze medal in the women's individual event at the 2014 Asian Games.
