= Yuka Sato (triathlete) =

Japanese triathlete (born 1992)

Medal record

Representing Japan

Women's triathlon

Asian Games
Gold medal – first place	2014 Incheon	Mixed relay
Gold medal – first place	2018 Jakarta-Palembang	Mixed relay
Gold medal – first place	2022 Hangzhou	Mixed relay

Youth Olympic Games
Gold medal – first place	2010 Singapore	Girls'

Asian Beach Games
Silver medal – second place	2014 Phuket	Women's individual

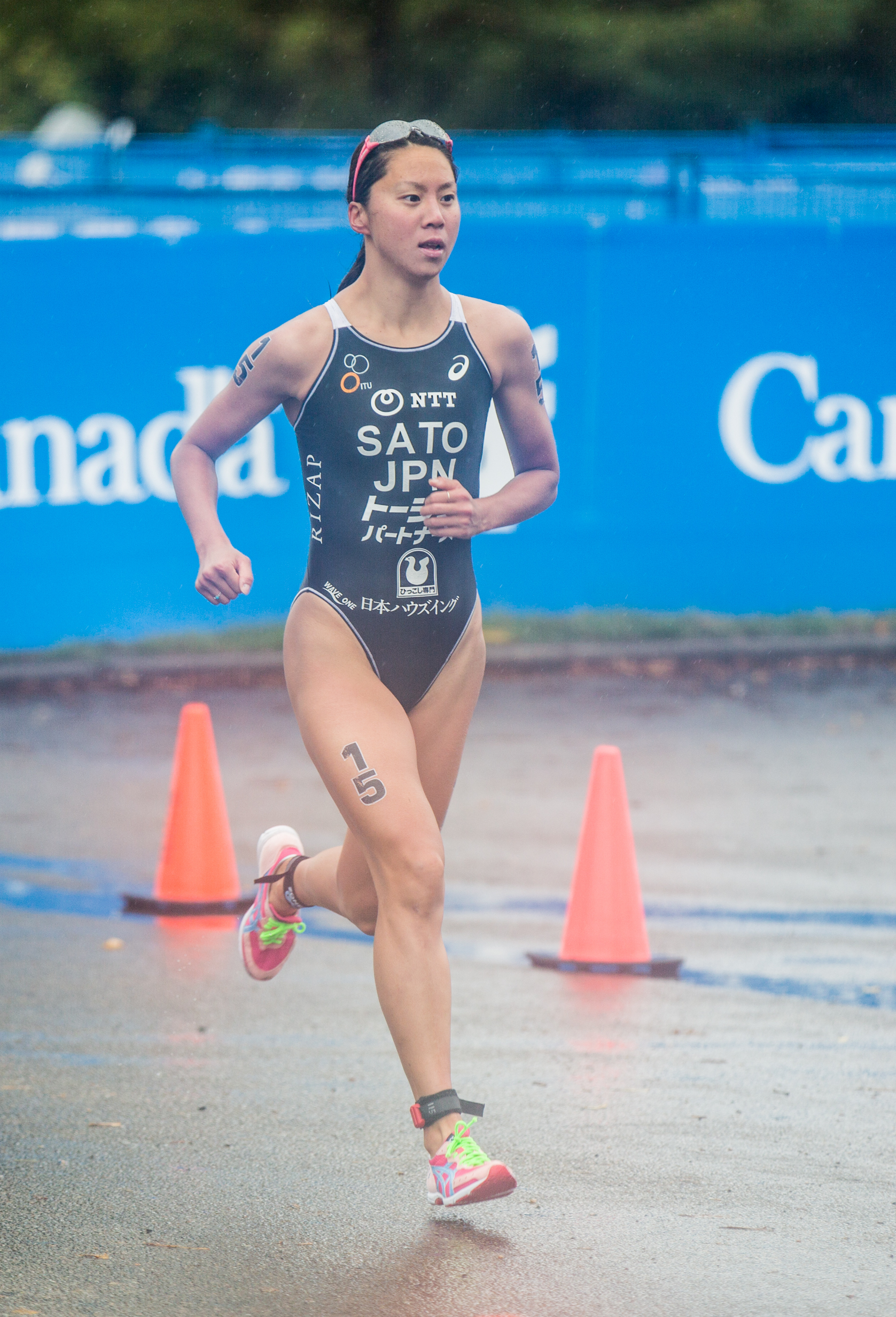

Yuka Sato (佐藤 優香, Satō Yuka; born 1992, Chiba) is a Japanese triathlete. She won a gold medal in the Girls' Triathlon event at the 2010 Summer Youth Olympics.
