= Dmitriy Gaag =

Kazakhstani triathlete (born 1971)

Personal information
- Native name: Дмитрий Владимирович Гааг
- Full name: Dmitry Vladimirovich Gaag
- Born: 21 March 1971 (age 55) Karaganda, Kazakh SSR, Soviet Union
Medal record
Men's triathlon
Representing Kazakhstan
Asian Games
Bronze medal – third place	2010 Guangzhou	Elite
Gold medal – first place	2006 Doha	Elite
ITU World Championships
Gold medal – first place	1999 Montreal	Elite
Bronze medal – third place	2004 Madeira	Elite
ITU World Cup
Gold medal – first place	2000	Overall
Gold medal – first place	2004	Overall

Dmitry Vladimirovich Gaag (Kazakh: Дмитрий Владимирович Гааг; born 20 March 1971) is an athlete from Karaganda, who competes in the triathlon. Gaag competed at the first Olympic triathlon at the 2000 Summer Olympics. He took fourth place with a total time of 1:49:03.57.

He competed again at the second Olympic triathlon at the 2004 Summer Olympics, dropping to twenty-fifth place with a time 1:56:28.97.

On 6 September 2008, Gaag was banned for two years beginning 20 June 2008 after testing positive for recombinant erythropoietin (EPO).
