= Yuichi Hosoda =

Japanese triathlete (born 1984)

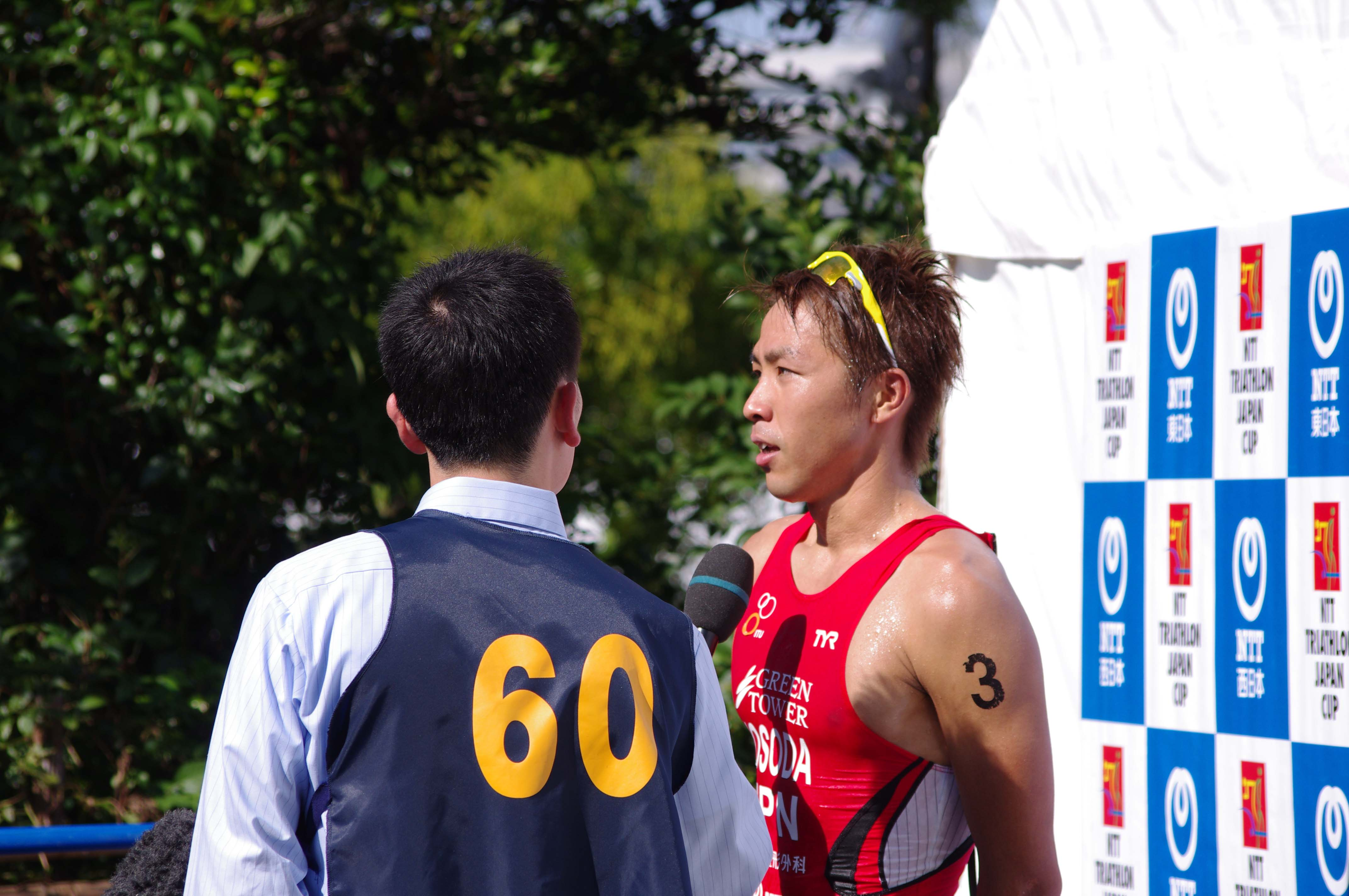

Medal record

Representing Japan

Men's triathlon

ITU Aquathlon World Championships
Gold medal – first place	2014 Edmonton	Men's Elite

Asian Games
Gold medal – first place	2010 Guangzhou	Men's individual
Gold medal – first place	2014 Incheon	Men's individual
Gold medal – first place	2014 Incheon	Mixed relay
Gold medal – first place	2018 Jakarta-Palembang	Mixed relay

Asian Beach Games
Gold medal – first place	2010 Muscat	Men's individual

Yuichi Hosoda (細田 雄一, Hosoda Yūichi, born 6 December 1984) is a Japanese triathlete. He was a competitor for Japan at the 2012 Summer Olympics where Hosoda finished 43rd overall with a total time of 1:51:40.

Hosoda won the gold medal in Triathlon at the 2010 Asian Games in a time of 1:52:15.56. He is the winner of the 2014 ITU Aquathlon World Championship.
