= Mariko Adachi =

Japanese triathlete (born 1983)

Personal information
- Born: 21 July 1983 (age 42) Hirakata, Osaka, Japan

Sport
- Sport: Triathlon

Mariko Adachi (足立 真梨子, Adachi Mariko; born 21 July 1983) is a Japanese triathlete. She competed in the Women's event at the 2012 Summer Olympics.
