= Heo Min-ho =

South Korean triathlete (born 1990)

Personal information
- Born: 1 March 1990 (age 36) Seoul, South Korea
- Height: 1.77 m (5 ft 10 in)
- Weight: 68 kg (150 lb)

Sport
- Country: South Korea
- Sport: Triathlon
Medal record
Representing South Korea
Asian Games
Silver medal – second place	2014 Incheon	Mixed relay
Silver medal – second place	2018 Palembang	Mixed relay
Asian Beach Games
Gold medal – first place	2014 Phuket	Men's individual

Heo Min-ho (Korean: 허민호; (born 1 March 1990) is a South Korean triathlete. He competed in the Men's event at the 2012 Summer Olympics.

He is the first and remains the only South Korean to have competed in the Triathlon Event at the Olympics Games.

== Biography ==
Heo was born on March 1, 1990, in Gangnam, Seoul, South Korea. His father, Heo Jae-dok, owns a small business and is a former track and field athlete.

He started swimming at the age of 5 for exercise. When he was in the first grade at Guryong Elementary School, he began training in triathlon at 8 years old under the guidance of a coach at a local sports center.

He used to compete in the National Youth Sports Festival as a track and field athlete in elementary school. At the age of 12, he briefly trained as a soccer player before returning to triathlon.

== Career ==
In 2006, as a first-year student at Hapdeok High School in Dangjin, South Chungcheong Province Heo surprisingly won a gold medal at the 87th Korean National Sports Festival, defeating all the 20s and 30s senior national team athletes with a record of 1 hour 52 minutes 48 seconds as his first participation. His performance shows the strong potential for future Olympic success.

From 2007, Heo won the Asian Junior Championships for three consecutive years. He also placed 7th in the junior division at the 2008 and 2009 ITU World Championships.

Starting in 2010, Heo began competing in senior-level events. He finished 6th at the Tongyeong ITU World Cup and 5th at the 2010 Asian Games in Guangzhou.

In 2011, Heo maintained his position among Asia’s top athletes by placing 8th at the Seoul ITU World Cup in May and 3rd at the Asian Championships in September.

In 2012, the Korea Triathlon Federation announced that Heo was included in the list of 55 Olympic athletes based on rankings and scores, marking the first time a Korean triathlete has qualified for the Olympics.

In 2013, Heo won first place in Elite Men at the 94th Korean National Sports Festival.

In 2014, Heo won a silver medal in the Mixed Relay at the 2014 Asian Games in Incheon. In November, He won a gold medal in Elite Men and finished 4th in Mixed Relay at 2014 Asian Beach Games at Phuket, Thailand.

In 2015, Heo enlisted in the Korea Armed Forces Athletic Corps and joined the Tongyeong Triathlon Army Team, which was created in December 2014 to prepare for the Military World Games, hosted by South Korea. He won a gold medal in Team Relay in 2015 Military World Games.

In 2017, Heo won two gold medals in Elite Men and Team Relay in the 98th Korean National Sports Festival.

In 2018, Heo won another silver medal in the Mixed Relay at the 2018 Asian Games at Palembang, Indonesia. and finished 9th in Elite Men. In November, he won two gold medals in Elite Men and Team Relay in the 99th Korean National Sports Festival in 2018.

In 2021, on the 21st November, Heo announced his retirement after participating in the Goseong Triathlon Championships. He also had the honor of being the first triathlete to receive an official retirement ceremony from the Korea Triathlon Federation.

In 2025, after announcing his appointment as a coach for the Busan Sports Council Triathlon Team, it was reported that he would return as a player-coach.

On June 2, 2026, Korea Triathlon Federation announced that Heo was selected as a member of South Korea's national team for the 2026 Asian Games in Aichi and Nagoya, Japan.

== International achievement ==
Triathlon
Asian Games
Year	Place	Medal	Event
2014	Incheon South Korea	2nd place, silver medalist(s)	Mixed Relay
2018	Palembang Indonesia	2nd place, silver medalist(s)	Mixed Relay
Asian Beach Games
2014	Phuket Thailand	1st place, gold medalist(s)	Individual
Asian Triathlon Championship
Year	Place	Medal	Event
2011	Yilan Taiwan	3rd place, bronze medalist(s)	Individual
2012	Tateyama Japan	2nd place, silver medalist(s)	Mixed Relay
2015	New Taipei City Taiwan	2nd place, silver medalist(s)	Mixed Relay
2016	Hatsukaichi Japan	1st place, gold medalist(s)	Mixed Relay
Asian Triathlon Junior Championship
Year	Place	Medal	Event
2007	Tongyeong South Korea	1st place, gold medalist(s)	Individual
2009	Incheon South Korea	1st place, gold medalist(s)	Individual

== ITU competitions ==
The following list is based upon the official ITU rankings and the Athlete's Profile Page.

Results list

Date	Competition (Event name)	City	Time	Position
2005-07-02	2005 Singapore ASTC Triathlon Asian Championships	Singapore	01:01:35	10
2006-09-02	2006 Lausanne ITU Triathlon World Championships	Lausanne	01:00:23	20
2007-06-01	2007 Tongyeong ASTC Triathlon Asian Championships	Tongyeong	00:54:17	1
2007-06-24	2007 Sokcho City ITU Triathlon Asian Cup	Sokcho City	00:58:27	1
2007-08-30	2007 Hamburg BG Triathlon World Championships	Hamburg	DNF	DNF
2008-03-09	2008 Wellington OTU Triathlon Oceania Championships	Wellington	01:59:00	5
2008-05-25	2008 Seoul ITU Triathlon Asian Cup	Seoul	01:46:03	8
2008-06-05	2008 Vancouver BG Triathlon World Championships	Vancouver	00:58:26	7
2008-06-15	2008 Seorak ITU Triathlon Asian Cup	Seorak	01:53:02	4
2008-07-06	2008 Shichigahama ITU Triathlon Asian Cup	Shichigahama	01:56:12	6
2008-11-15	2008 Hong Kong ITU Triathlon Asian Cup	Hong Kong	01:59:12	6
2009-01-14	2009 Australian Youth Olympic Festival	Sydney	00:54:06	11
2009-03-29	2009 Mooloolaba ITU Triathlon World Cup	Mooloolaba	01:57:23	21
2009-05-02	2009 Dextro Energy Triathlon – WCS Tongyeong	Tongyeong	01:53:23	39
2009-06-14	2009 Gamagori ITU Triathlon Asian Cup	Gamagori	DNF	DNF
2009-06-27	2009 Hy-Vee ITU Triathlon Elite Cup	Des Moines	DNF	DNF
2009-08-28	2009 Incheon ASTC Triathlon Asian Championships	Incheon	00:56:01	1
2009-09-09	2009 WCS Grand Final Gold Coast	Gold Coast	00:55:14	7
2009-11-08	2009 Huatulco ITU Triathlon World Cup	Huatulco	DNF	DNF
2010-04-11	2010 WCS Sydney	Sydney	01:59:20	45
2010-05-08	2010 WCS Seoul	Seoul	01:56:05	46
2010-09-08	2010 WCS Grand Final Budapest	Budapest	01:47:16	22
2010-10-16	2010 Tongyeong ITU Triathlon World Cup	Tongyeong	01:49:59	6
2010-11-13	2010 Guangzhou Asian Games	Guangzhou	01:54:09	5
2011-05-15	2011 Seoul ITU Triathlon Asian Cup	Seoul	01:53:45	8
2011-06-26	2011 Gamagori ITU Triathlon Asian Cup	Gamagori	DNF	DNF
2011-07-10	2011 Edmonton ITU Triathlon World Cup	Edmonton	01:48:54	26
2011-08-20	2011 Lausanne ITU Elite Sprint Triathlon World Championships	Lausanne	00:55:04	48
2011-09-23	2011 Yilan ASTC Triathlon Asian Championships	Yilan	02:01:20	3
2011-10-15	2011 Tongyeong ITU Triathlon World Cup	Tongyeong	01:50:10	5
2011-11-20	2011 Auckland ITU Triathlon World Cup	Auckland	DNF	DNF
2012-03-24	2012 Mooloolaba ITU Triathlon World Cup	Mooloolaba	01:59:07	43
2012-04-07	2012 Tateyama ASTC Triathlon Asian Championships	Tateyama	01:41:32	5
2012-04-07	2012 Tateyama ASTC Triathlon Asian Championships (Mixed Relay)	Tateyama	00:15:08	2
2012-04-22	2012 Ishigaki ITU Triathlon World Cup	Ishigaki	01:52:11	26
2012-05-06	2012 Huatulco ITU Triathlon World Cup	Huatulco	DNF	DNF
2012-05-26	2012 ITU World Triathlon Madrid	Madrid	02:00:57	53
2012-08-04	London 2012 Olympic Games	London	01:54:30	54
2012-10-20	2012 World Triathlon Grand Final Auckland	Auckland	02:02:34	25
2013-04-14	2013 Ishigaki ITU Triathlon World Cup	Ishigaki	01:56:21	10
2013-09-11	2013 ITU World Triathlon Grand Final London	London	DNF	DNF
2013-10-12	2013 Tongyeong ITU Triathlon World Cup	Tongyeong	DNF	DNF
2013-10-21	2013 KOR Triathlon National Championships	South Korea	01:55:31	3
2014-02-16	2014 Elwood OTU Sprint Triathlon Oceania Cup	Elwood	00:58:33	11
2014-03-15	2014 Mooloolaba ITU Triathlon World Cup	Mooloolaba	00:57:13	47
2014-04-26	2014 Subic Bay ASTC Triathlon Asian Cup	Subic Bay	01:51:03	4
2014-05-10	2014 Chengdu ITU Triathlon World Cup	Chengdu	01:52:34	50
2014-06-07	2014 Shizuishan ASTC Triathlon Premium Asian Cup	Shizuishan	01:53:35	26
2014-07-26	2014 Jiayuguan ITU Triathlon World Cup	Jiayuguan	01:52:25	31
2014-09-25	2014 Incheon Asian Games	Incheon	DNF	DNF
2014-09-25	2014 Incheon Asian Games (Mixed Relay)	Incheon	00:18:25	2
2014-10-18	2014 Tongyeong ITU Triathlon World Cup	Tongyeong	01:51:09	29
2014-11-01	2014 KOR Triathlon National Championships	South Korea	01:56:05	2
2014-11-17	2014 Phuket Asian Beach Games – Triathlon	Phuket	00:54:10	1
2014-11-17	2014 Phuket Asian Beach Games – Mixed Relay	Phuket	00:22:21	4
2015-03-14	2015 Mooloolaba ITU Triathlon World Cup	Mooloolaba	LAP	LAP
2015-03-22	2015 New Plymouth ITU Triathlon World Cup	New Plymouth	00:56:28	57
2015-05-09	2015 Chengdu ITU Triathlon World Cup	Chengdu	01:47:59	31
2015-06-11	2015 New Taipei ASTC Triathlon Asian Championships	New Taipei	02:05:17	6
2015-06-11	2015 New Taipei ASTC Triathlon Asian Championships (Mixed Relay)	New Taipei	00:18:15	2
2015-06-27	2015 Burabay ASTC Sprint Triathlon Asian Cup	Burabay	00:56:21	3
2015-07-04	2015 Shizuishan ASTC Triathlon Premium Asian Cup	Shizuishan	01:52:52	13
2015-07-12	2015 Osaka ASTC Sprint Triathlon Asian Cup	Osaka	01:00:37	4
2015-07-18	2015 ITU World Triathlon Hamburg	Hamburg	00:54:14	40
2015-07-18	2015 Hamburg ITU Triathlon Mixed Relay World Championships	Hamburg	LAP	LAP
2015-09-05	2015 ITU World Triathlon Edmonton	Edmonton	00:54:59	32
2015-09-20	2015 Murakami ASTC Triathlon Asian Cup	Murakami	01:46:03	1
2015-10-17	2015 KOR Triathlon National Championships	South Korea	01:57:45	8
2015-10-24	2015 Tongyeong ITU Triathlon World Cup	Tongyeong	01:50:32	27
2015-11-28	2015 Pariaman ASTC Sprint Triathlon Asian Cup	Pariaman	00:55:14	6
2016-04-16	2016 Chengdu ITU Triathlon World Cup	Chengdu	01:52:30	37
2016-04-29	2016 Hatsukaichi ASTC Triathlon Asian Championships (Mixed Relay)	Hatsukaichi	00:19:14	1
2016-04-29	2016 Hatsukaichi ASTC Triathlon Asian Championships	Hatsukaichi	DNF	DNF
2016-05-07	2016 Huatulco ITU Triathlon World Cup	Huatulco	02:10:55	39
2016-07-16	2016 Hamburg ITU Triathlon Mixed Relay World Championships	Hamburg	LAP	LAP
2016-07-16	2016 ITU World Triathlon Hamburg	Hamburg	00:54:49	48
2016-10-09	2016 KOR Triathlon National Championships	South Korea	01:50:55	2
2016-10-22	2016 Tongyeong ITU Triathlon World Cup	Tongyeong	00:55:11	34
2016-10-29	2016 Miyazaki ITU Triathlon World Cup	Miyazaki	DNF	DNF
2017-10-28	2017 Tongyeong ITU Triathlon World Cup	Tongyeong	00:52:38	13
2018-03-10	2018 Mooloolaba ITU Triathlon World Cup	Mooloolaba	00:57:45	44
2018-03-25	2018 New Plymouth ITU Triathlon World Cup	New Plymouth	01:01:16	29
2018-04-21	2018 Subic Bay NTT ASTC Triathlon Asian Cup	Subic Bay	01:50:55	2
2018-05-19	2018 Astana ITU Triathlon World Cup	Astana	01:42:17	45
2018-06-23	2018 Wuustwezel ETU Sprint Triathlon European Cup	Wuustwezel	00:52:57	23
2018-06-30	2018 Holten ETU Sprint Triathlon Premium European Cup	Holten	00:56:49	17
2018-07-27	2018 Mixed Relay Series Edmonton	Edmonton	LAP	LAP
2018-07-27	2018 ITU World Triathlon Edmonton	Edmonton	DNF	DNF
2018-08-31	2018 Palembang Asian Games (Mixed Relay)	Palembang	00:22:11	2
2018-08-31	2018 Palembang Asian Games	Palembang	01:54:21	9
2018-09-22	2018 Weihai ITU Triathlon World Cup	Weihai	02:00:08	38
2018-10-13	2018 KOR Triathlon National Championships	South Korea	01:54:59	1
2018-10-20	2018 Hong Kong ASTC Sprint Triathlon Asian Cup	Hong Kong	DSQ	DSQ
2018-10-27	2018 Tongyeong ITU Triathlon World Cup	Tongyeong	00:54:34	15
2019-04-07	2019 Gold Coast OTU Sprint Triathlon Oceania Cup	Gold Coast	00:53:28	14
2019-04-27	2019 Subic Bay NTT ASTC Triathlon Asian Cup	Subic Bay	DNF	DNF
2019-08-03	2019 Almaty ASTC Sprint Triathlon Asian Cup	Almaty	DNF	DNF
2019-10-08	2019 KOR Triathlon National Championships	South Korea	01:58:05	10
2025-09-26	2025 Asia Triathlon Cup Yilan	Yilan	00:53:39	12
2025-11-15	2025 World Triathlon Cup Tongyeong	Tongyeong	00:54:59	44

DNF = Did not finish
DSQ = Disqualified

== Filmography ==
=== Television shows ===
Year	Title	Role	Notes	Ref.
2021–2023	The Gentlemen's League 2	Regular Member		
2023–2025	The Gentlemen's League 3	Regular Member		
2024	Iron Girls	Coach	Episode 5 – 11	
2025	The Gentlemen's League 4	Regular Member		
