= Songdo Central Park =

Public park in Incheon, South Korea

- 센트럴파크
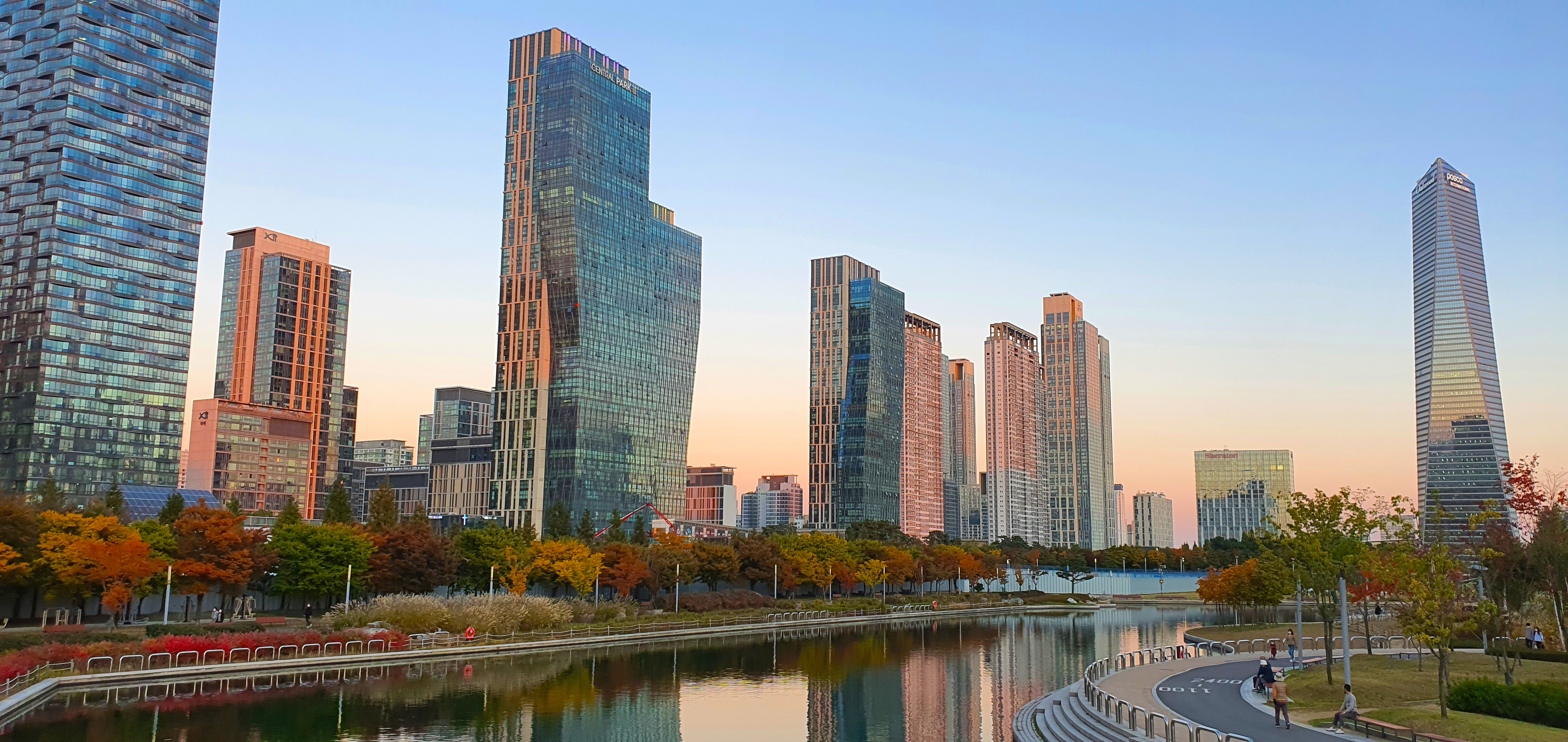
- Songdo Central Park
- Interactive map of Songdo Central Park
- Type: Public Park
- Location: 160, Convensia-daero, Yeonsu District, Incheon, South Korea
- Coordinates: 37°23′33″N 126°38′22″E
- Area: 101 acres (41 ha)
- Opening: August 2009
- Designer: Gale International, POSCO E&C, KPF, Yooshin, Associate Architect; Arup, Canal Engineering; DaeIl, Park Engineering; Ung-Do, Hedrick, III, Horticultural Consultant.
- Status: Complete

Songdo Central Park (Korean: 송도 센트럴파크; 송도 중앙공원) is a public park in the Songdo district of Incheon, South Korea. The park is the centerpiece of Songdo IBD's green space plan, inspired by New York City's Central Park. Central Park is a public zone in the center of Korea's first international city, covering 101 acres (41 hectares); the park covers almost 10% of Songdo IBD’s total area. It serves to connect to various civic and cultural destinations by providing a seawater canal that refreshes itself every 24 hours.

== Amenities ==
The park has become popular with families in Songdo and Incheon, and draws day-visitors from the Seoul area. The forested area in the park also fills with daytime tents and campers on weekends. A patio on the east side of the park has cafes and small restaurants. A water-taxi service crosses the lake for transportation and tourism, and kayaks can be rented.

Central Park is accessible from the nearby Canal Walk shopping court or by Central Park Station of Incheon Metro Line 1.

== In popular culture ==
Several scenes of the 2012 Gangnam Style music video by Psy were filmed in Songdo Central Park. First, there was a scene in the underground parking lot. This was where Psy had a dance battle with Yoo Jae-suk, who was wearing a yellow suit. In addition, there was another shot taken in the elevator of the same building. There Noh Hong-chul thrust his pelvis while Psy was rapping below him as the elevator door closes.

== Gallery ==
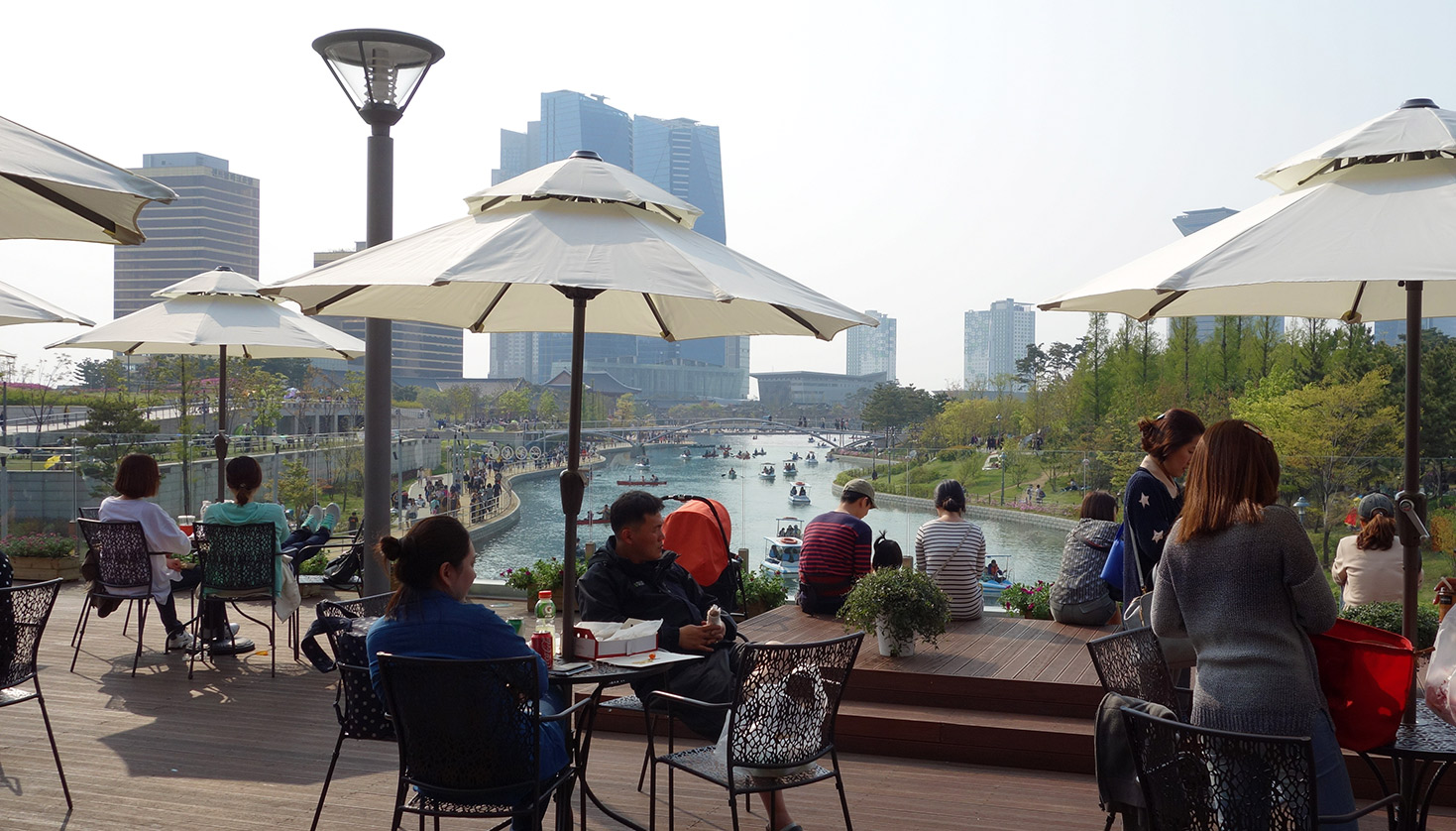
Central Park Patio View of Lake

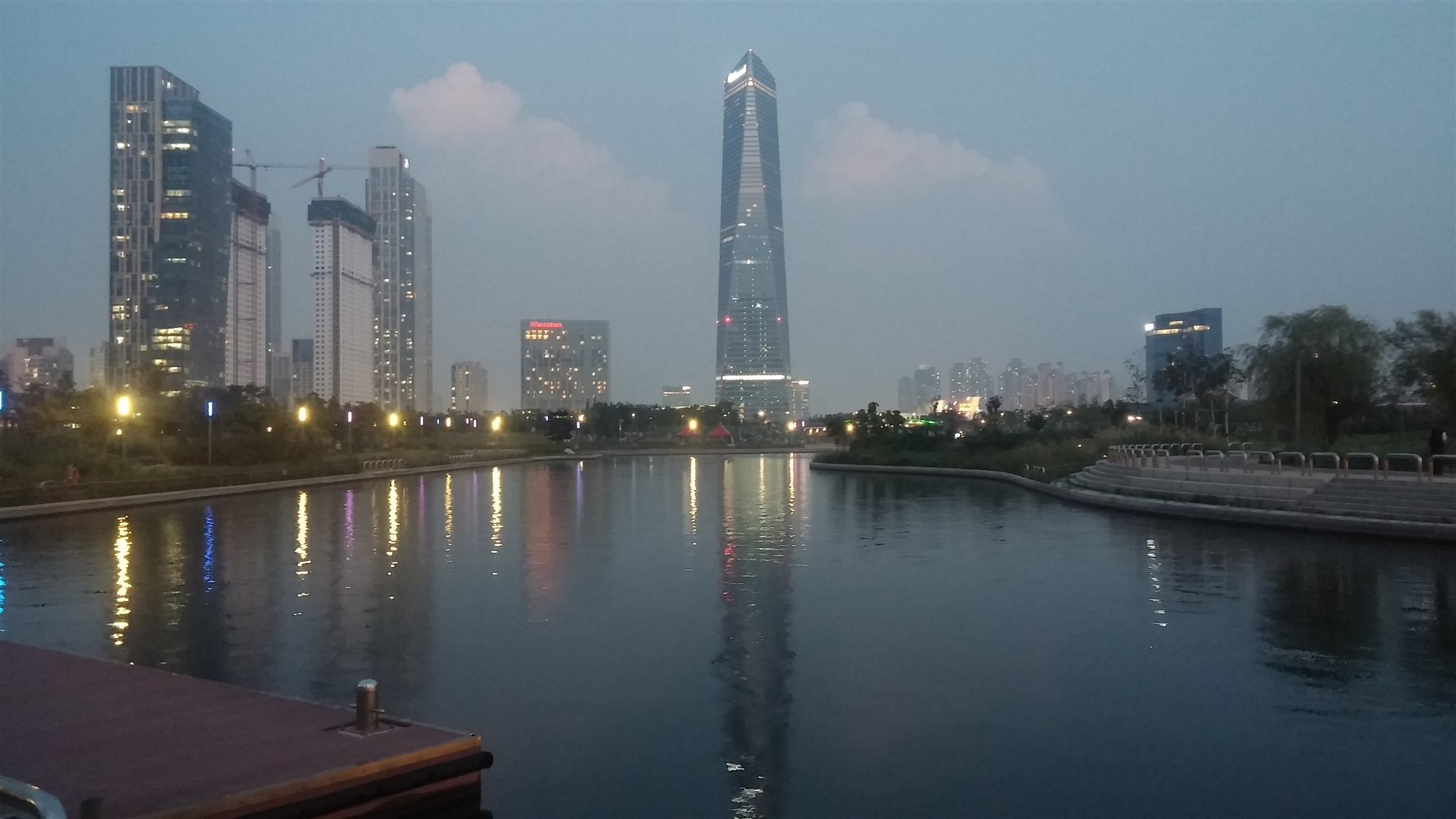
Central Park at Night

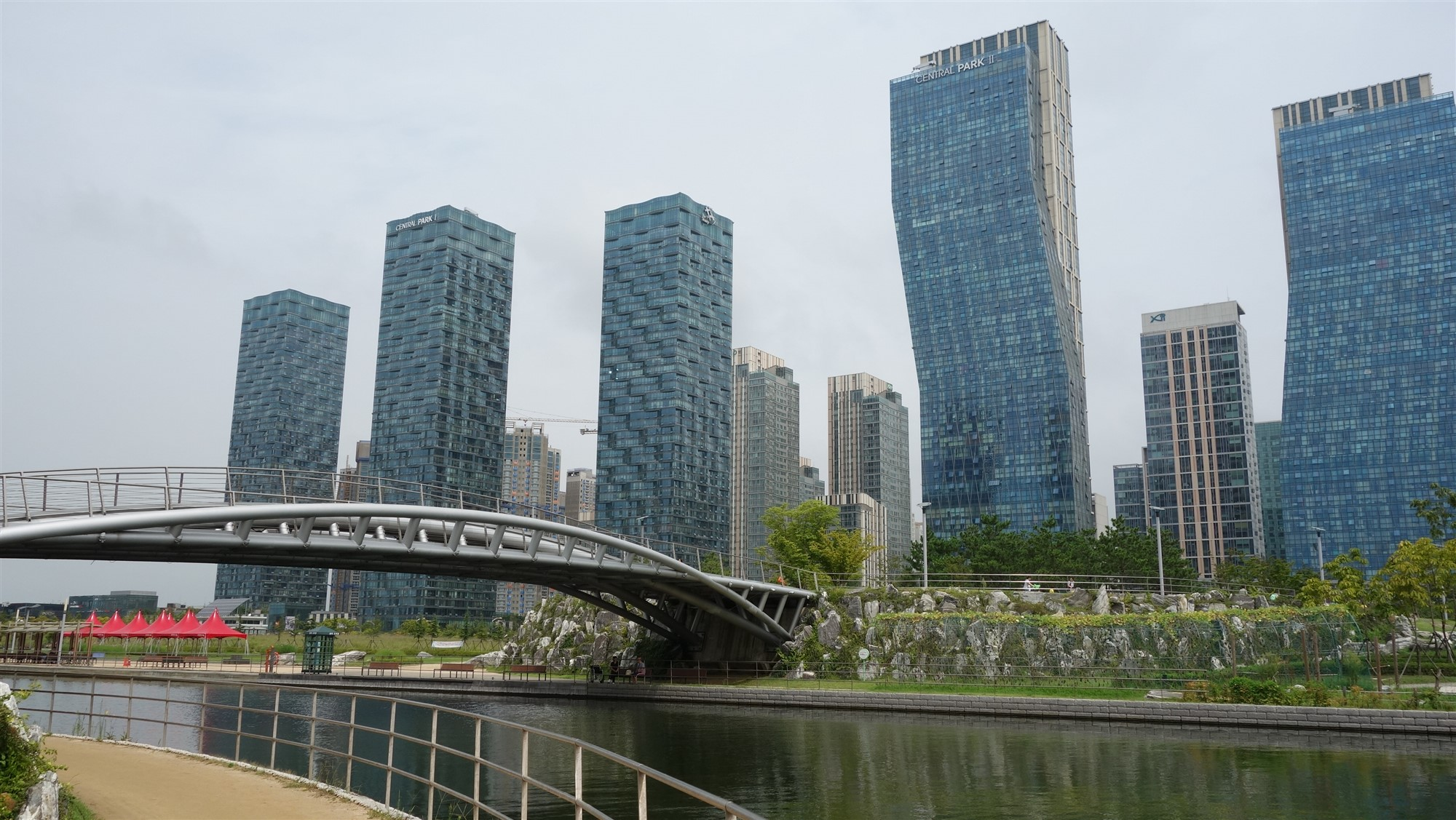
View of Buildings from Central Park Bridge

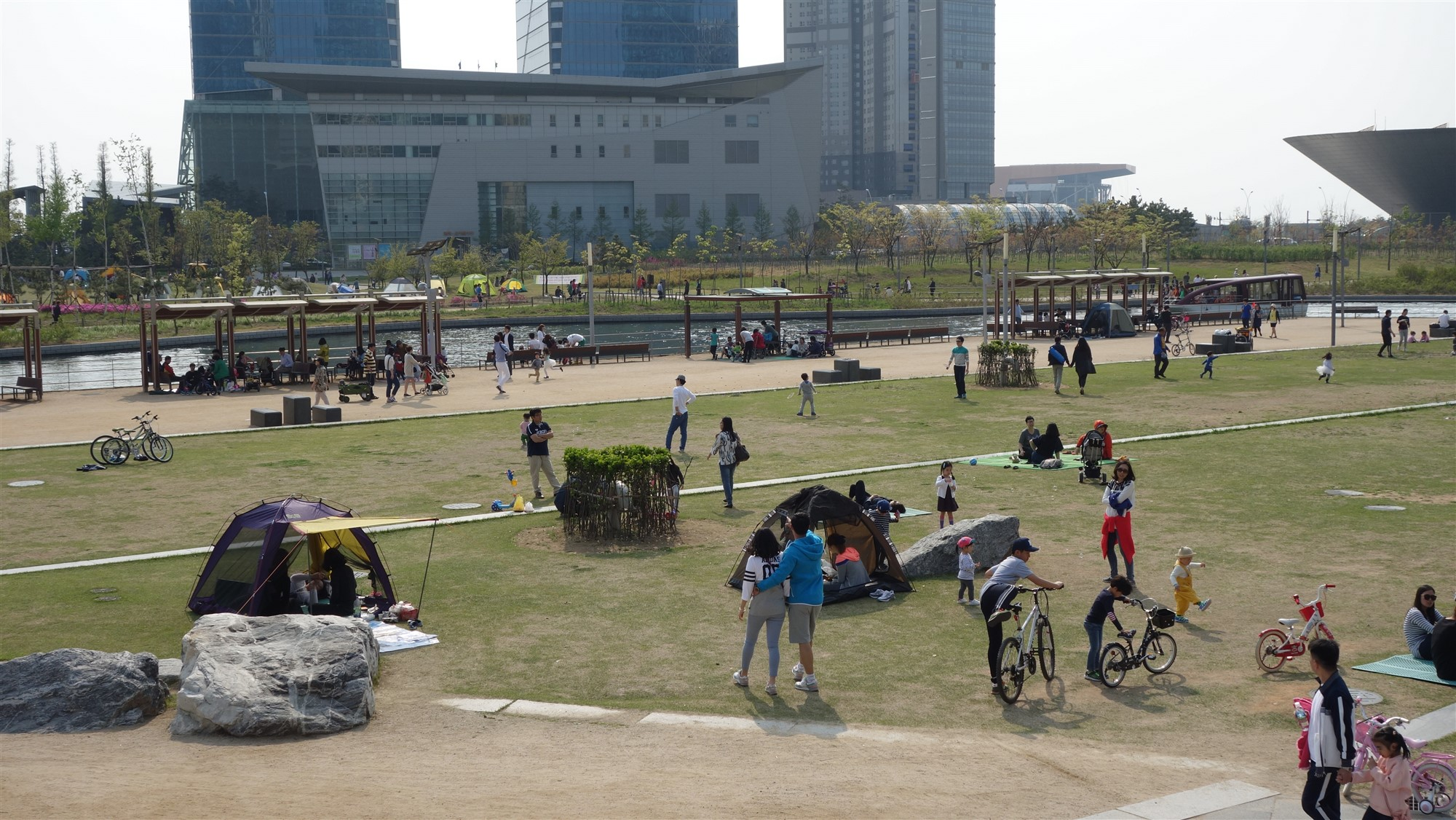
Central Park Lawn

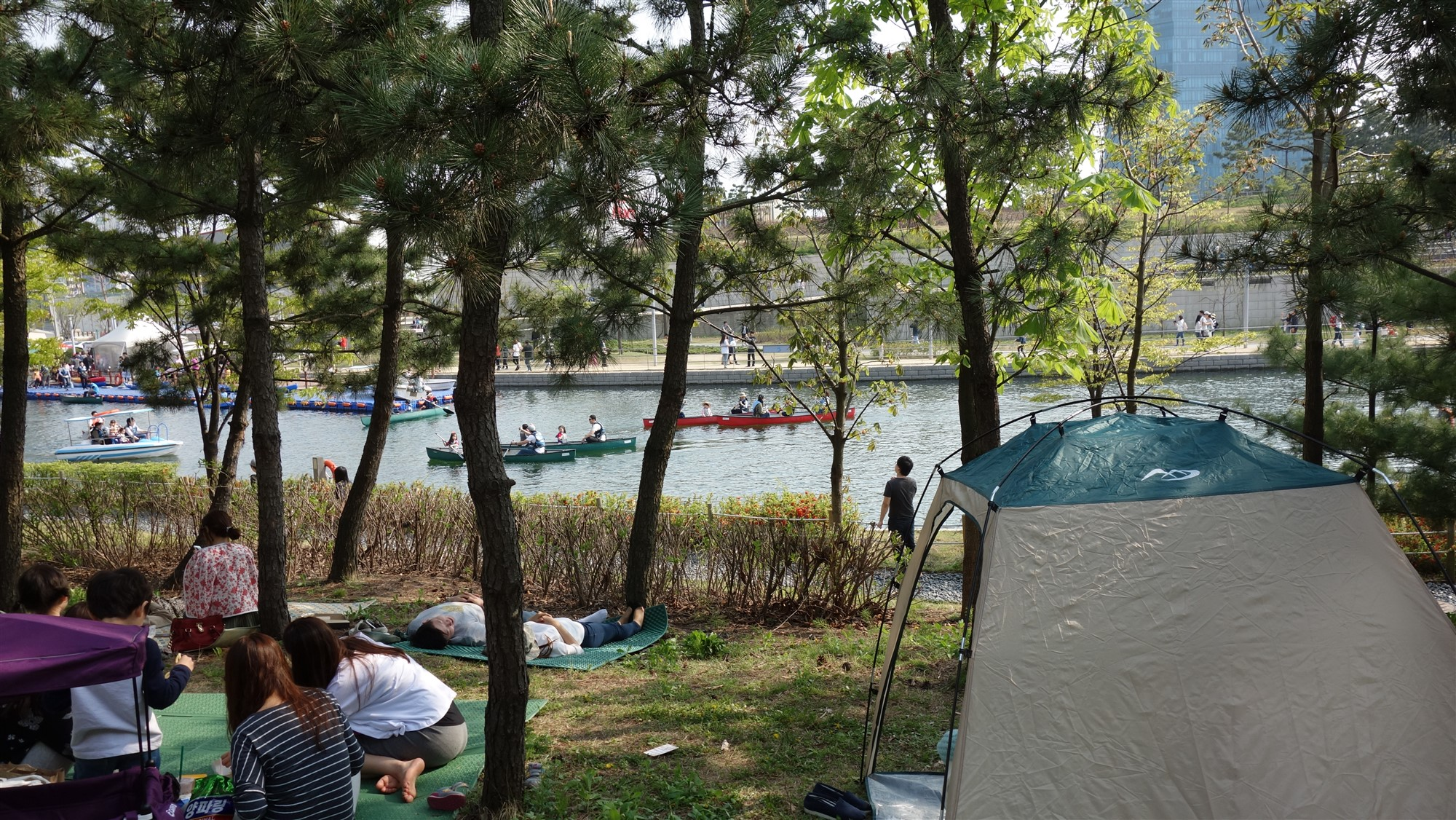
Central Park Campers

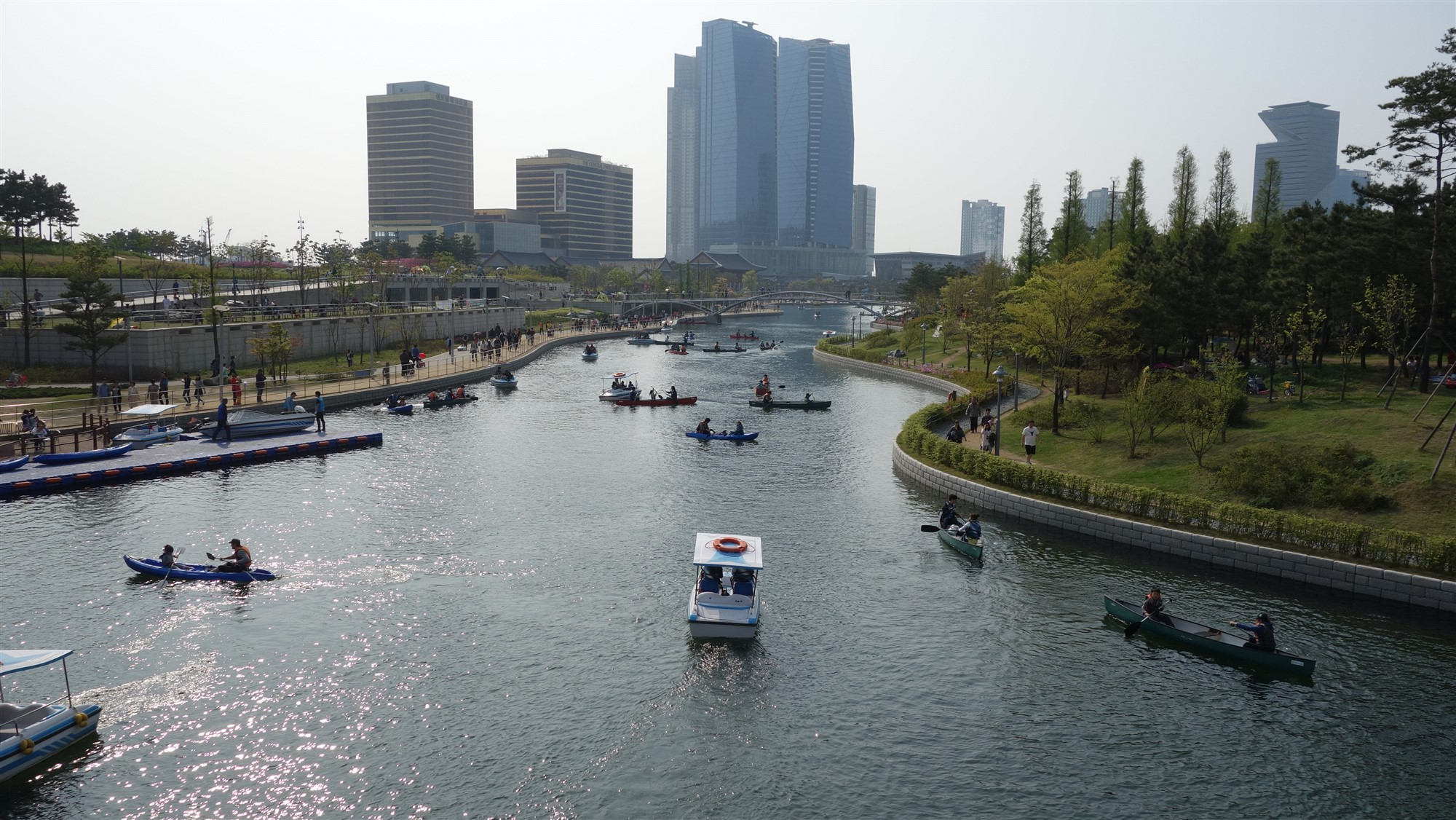
Central Park Lake

Songdo Tri-Bowl
