= Bai Faquan =

Chinese triathlete (born 1986)

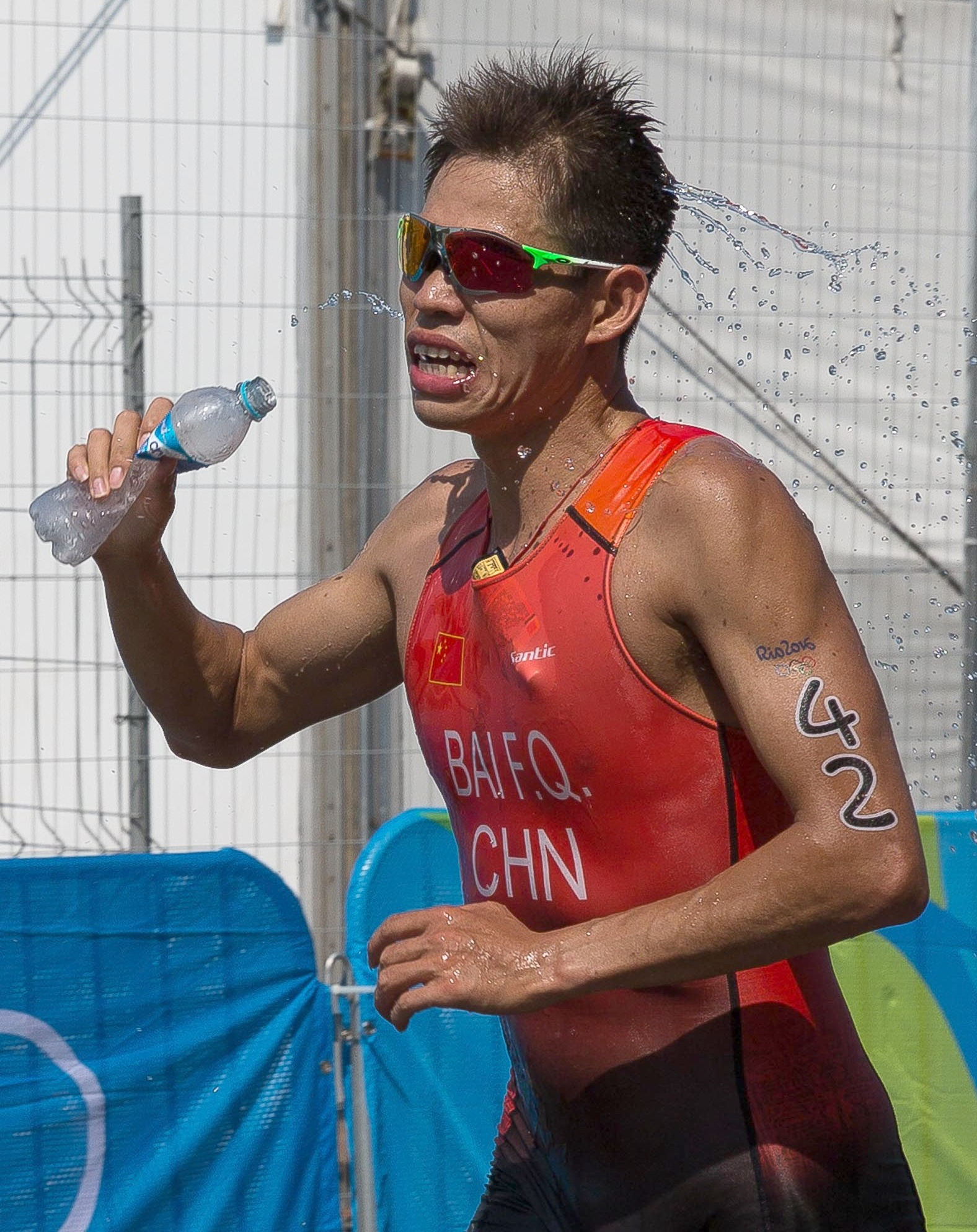
- Bai at the 2016 Olympics

Personal information
- Born: 18 March 1986 (age 40) Dali, Yunnan, China
- Education: Yunnan Normal University
- Height: 173 cm (5 ft 8 in)
- Weight: 66 kg (146 lb)

Sport
- Sport: Triathlon
- Club: Army Triathlon Team; Chengdu Triathlon Club
- Coached by: He Xuegong; Yang Sheng
Medal record
Representing China
Asian Games
| Bronze medal – third place | 2014 Incheon | Individual |
| Bronze medal – third place | 2014 Incheon | Team relay |

Bai Faquan (白 发全, born 18 March 1986) is a Chinese triathlete who won individual and team bronze medals at the 2014 Asian Games. He placed 46th at the 2012 Olympic Triathlon and 50th at the 2016 Olympics Triathlon.

Bai started as a swimmer and changed to triathlon in 2007. He trains 364 days per year.
