= Ai Ueda =

Japanese triathlete (born 1983)

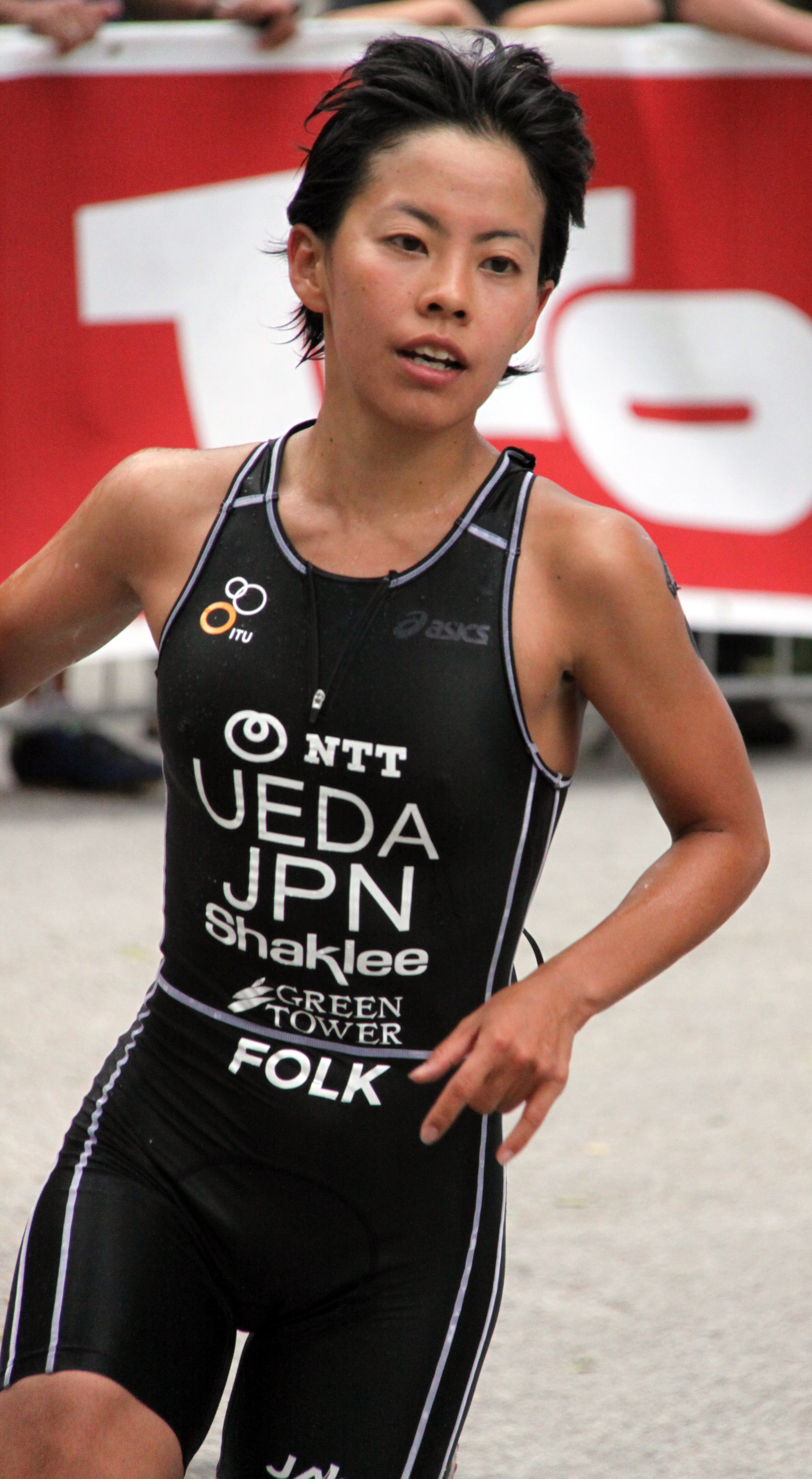
- Ueda at the World Championship Series triathlon in Kitzbühel, 2010

Personal information
- Born: 26 October 1983 (age 42) Kyoto, Japan
- Height: 1.55 m (5 ft 1 in)
- Weight: 45 kg (99 lb)

Sport
- Country: Japan
- Sport: Triathlon
- Turned pro: 2003
- Coached by: Hideki Yamane
Medal record
Women's Duathlon
Representing Japan
World Games
| Gold medal – first place | 2013 Cali | Duathlon |
| Silver medal – second place | 2022 Birmingham | Individual |
World Duathlon Championships
| Gold medal – first place | 2013 Ottawa | Individual |
| Silver medal – second place | 2015 Adelaide | Individual |
| Silver medal – second place | 2018 Fyn | Individual |
| Silver medal – second place | 2021 Aviles | Individual |
| Bronze medal – third place | 2022 Targu Mures | Individual |
| Bronze medal – third place | 2023 Ibiza | Individual |

Ai Ueda (Japanese: 上田藍, born 26 October 1983 in Kyoto) is a Japanese triathlete. She is the winner of the 2005 and 2008 Asian Triathlon Championship and the winner of the 2013 ITU Duathlon World Championships. She has represented Japan in triathlon in both the 2008 and 2012 Summer Olympics.

== Career ==
Ai Ueda moved to Chiba after finishing high school to dedicate herself completely to triathlon. In the same year she won the Junior Asian Championships and in 2003 she became an Elite triathlete.

In the 2008 Summer Olympics, Ai Ueda took 17th in women's triathlon. In the 2012 Summer Olympics she placed 39th.

=== ITU competitions ===
In the nine years from 2002 to 2010, Ueda took part in 88 ITU competitions and achieved 29 top ten positions, among which 12 gold medals. In the World Championship Rankings 2010 Ai Ueda is number 31 of the world's best female elite triathletes. Unless indicated otherwise, all competitions are triathlons (Olympic distance) and belong to the "Elite" category.

Results list

| Date | Competition | Place | Rank |
|---|---|---|---|
| 2002-09-29 | Asian Regional Championships | Murakami City | 3 |
| 2002-11-09 | World Championships (Junior) | Cancun | 33 |
| 2003-06-07 | World Cup | Tongyeong | 18 |
| 2003-06-15 | World Cup | Gamagori | DNF |
| 2003-07-13 | World Cup | Edmonton | 28 |
| 2003-09-21 | World Cup | Madrid | 31 |
| 2003-10-13 | World Cup | Makuhari | 13 |
| 2003-12-06 | World Championships (U23) | Queenstown | 13 |
| 2004-04-11 | World Cup | Ishigaki | 26 |
| 2004-05-09 | World Championships (U23) | Madeira | 6 |
| 2004-06-05 | Asian Cup | Wakayama | 1 |
| 2004-06-12 | World Cup | Tongyeong | 8 |
| 2004-08-01 | World Cup | Tiszaújváros | 17 |
| 2004-09-26 | World Cup | Gamagori | 7 |
| 2004-10-31 | World Cup | Cancun | 16 |
| 2005-04-16 | World Cup | Honolulu | DNF |
| 2005-06-12 | Asian Cup | Makuhari | 5 |
| 2005-06-19 | Asian Cup | Wakayama | 3 |
| 2005-07-02 | ASTC Asian Championships (U23) | Singapore | 1 |
| 2005-07-10 | Asian Cup | Shichigahama | 1 |
| 2005-07-23 | World Cup | Edmonton | 21 |
| 2005-08-06 | World Cup | Hamburg | 30 |
| 2005-08-14 | World Cup | Tiszaújváros | 18 |
| 2005-09-10 | World Championships | Gamagori | 18 |
| 2005-09-17 | OSIM World Cup | Beijing | 23 |
| 2005-09-25 | Asian Cup | Murakami | 1 |
| 2005-10-23 | Asian Cup | Tokyo | 6 |
| 2006-03-03 | World Cup | Doha | 21 |
| 2006-03-26 | World Cup | Mooloolaba | 25 |
| 2006-04-16 | World Cup | Ishigaki | 18 |
| 2006-05-07 | World Cup | Mazatlan | 18 |
| 2006-06-04 | World Cup | Madrid | 18 |
| 2006-06-11 | World Cup | Richards Bay | 10 |
| 2006-06-25 | Asian Cup | Seorak | 1 |
| 2006-07-09 | World Cup | Edmonton | 27 |
| 2006-07-23 | World Cup | Corner Brook | 24 |
| 2006-07-30 | World Cup | Salford | 17 |
| 2006-08-12 | ASTC Asian Championships | Jiayuguan | 1 |
| 2006-09-02 | World Championships | Lausanne | 12 |
| 2006-09-09 | World Cup | Hamburg | 11 |
| 2006-09-24 | World Cup | Beijing | 28 |
| 2006-11-05 | World Cup | Cancun | 23 |
| 2006-12-08 | Asian Games Triathlon | Doha | 2 |
| 2007-04-15 | World Cup | Ishigaki | 18 |
| 2007-05-13 | World Cup | Richards Bay | 14 |
| 2007-06-01 | ASTC Asian Championships | Tongeyong | 2 |
| 2007-06-10 | World Cup | Vancouver | 18 |
| 2007-06-17 | World Cup | Des Moines | 21 |
| 2007-06-24 | World Cup | Edmonton | 26 |
| 2007-07-22 | World Cup | Kitzbühel | DNF |
| 2007-07-29 | World Cup | Salford | 45 |
| 2007-08-30 | World Championships | Hamburg | 18 |
| 2007-09-15 | World Cup | Beijing | 23 |
| 2007-11-04 | World Cup | Cancun | DNF |
| 2007-12-01 | World Cup | Eilat | 15 |
| 2008-03-08 | Pan American Cup | Valle de Bravo | 1 |
| 2008-03-14 | Pan American Cup | Salinas | 1 |
| 2008-04-06 | World Cup | New Plymouth | 17 |
| 2008-04-13 | World Cup | Ishigaki | 19 |
| 2008-04-26 | World Cup | Tongyeong | 4 |
| 2008-05-02 | ASTC Asian Championships | Guanzhou | 1 |
| 2008-06-05 | World Championships | Vancouver | 29 |
| 2008-07-20 | World Cup | Kitzbühel | 17 |
| 2008-08-18 | Olympic Games | Beijing | 17 |
| 2008-09-27 | World Cup | Lorient | 19 |
| 2009-03-08 | Pan American Cup | Playas | 4 |
| 2009-03-29 | World Cup | Mooloolaba | 17 |
| 2009-04-26 | World Cup | Ishigaki | 9 |
| 2009-05-02 | World Championship Series | Tongyeong | 36 |
| 2009-05-31 | World Championship Series | Madrid | 10 |
| 2009-06-21 | World Championship Series | Washington DC | DNF |
| 2009-06-27 | Elite Cup | Hy-Vee | 19 |
| 2009-07-25 | World Championship Series | Hamburg | 23 |
| 2009-08-15 | World Championship Series | London | 28 |
| 2009-08-22 | World Championship Series | Yokohama | 22 |
| 2009-08-28 | ASTC Asian Championships | Incheon | 2 |
| 2009-09-09 | World Championship Series, Grand Final | Gold Coast | 33 |
| 2009-11-08 | World Cup | Huatulco | 1 |
| 2010-02-05 | Pan American Cup | Salinas | 1 |
| 2010-03-20 | Pan American Cup | Mazatlan | 2 |
| 2010-04-11 | World Championship Series | Sydney | 36 |
| 2010-04-18 | World Cup | Monterrey | 2 |
| 2010-06-05 | World Championship Series | Madrid | 52 |
| 2010-07-17 | World Championship Series | Hamburg | 35 |
| 2010-07-24 | World Championship Series | London | 47 |
| 2010-08-14 | World Championship Series | Kitzbühel | 43 |
| 2010-09-08 | World Championship Series: Grand Final | Budapest | 24 |
| 2010-10-10 | World Cup | Huatulco | 1 |

DNF = Did not finish
