= Hirokatsu Tayama =

Japanese triathlete

Hirokatsu Tayama (田山 寛豪, Tayama Hirokatsu) (born November 12, 1981) is a triathlete from Japan.

Tayama competed at the second Olympic triathlon at the 2004 Summer Olympics. He placed 13th with a total time of 1:53:28.41. At the Olympic games in Beijing Tayama placed 48th in triathlon with a time of 1:56:13.68 at the 2008 Summer Olympics.

Tayama earned recognition as one of the fastest swimmers in triathlon by being the first person to complete the 2.4 mile swim at the 2005 Ironman World Championship at Kona, Hawaii.
