= Sheraton Grand Incheon Hotel =

Coordinates: 37.3904°N 126.6456°E

- 쉐라톤인천호텔
- Interactive map of the Sheraton Grand Incheon Hotel area

General information
- Status: Completed
- Type: Hotel
- Location: Songdo IBD, Songdo International City, Incheon Free Economic Zone, Incheon; South Korea
- Opening: August 2009; 16 years ago

Technical details
- Floor count: 22 floors
- Floor area: 52,626 sf, 319 Rooms

Design and construction
- Architect: HOK / BAUM / Heerim
- Developer: Gale International, POSCO E&C

Sheraton Grand Incheon Hotel is the first hotel to open in Songdo IBD. Hotel is adjacent to the Northeast Asia Trade Tower, Songdo Convensia, and Songdo Central Park.

It is a five-star rated hotel managed by Marriott International, and it is a LEED Certified hotel designed by HOK. The building's sustainable strategy includes two four-story-tall perforated aluminum sunshades that can minimize the exposure to direct solar gain. The hotel has 319 rooms, nine banquet halls, free Internet lounge, fitness center, a spa, and indoor swimming pool.
