= Songdo Canal Walk =

- 커낼워크
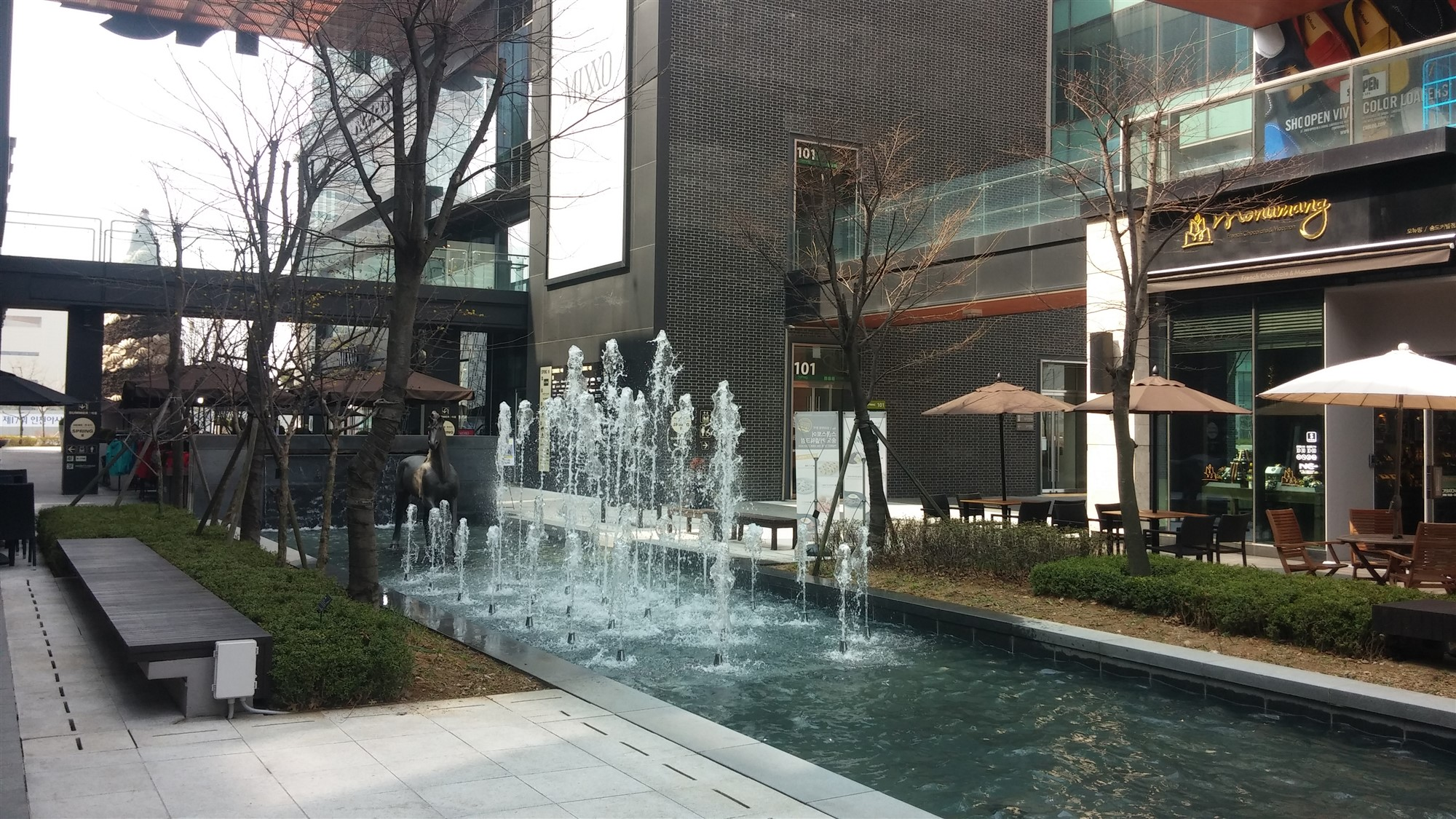
- Canal Walk in Songdo IBD

General information
- Status: Completed
- Type: Mixed-use
- Location: Songdo IBD, Songdo International City, Incheon Free Economic Zone, Incheon; South Korea
- Estimated completion: October 2009

Technical details
- Floor area: 1,272,788 sf

Design and construction
- Architect: KPF / Jina
- Developer: Gale International, POSCO E&C

Canal Walk is an outdoor shopping court in the International Business District Songdo IBD of Songdo, Incheon, South Korea. The court comprises four sections, one for each season, and is located along a stretch of a man-made canal running north to south. It stretches 2,625 feet within D1-D4 blocks. Each block contains five-story glass buildings; the first two stories are retail units that include fitness clubs, bookstores, clothing and general stores, cafes, and restaurants. The top three stories contain 445 luxury officetel units. The site also encourages pedestrian flow by protecting people from traffic and noise with its open-court walkway, although "season" sections require road crossings. The court is also located near Songdo Central Park.

== Popular culture ==
Songdo Canal Walk was used as the main filming location in episode 68 of the South Korean variety show Running Man filmed in 2011.
