= Posco Tower-Songdo =

Skyscraper in Incheon, South Korea

- 포스코타워-송도
- Posco Tower in Songdo (2019)
- Interactive map of the Posco Tower-Songdo area

General information
- Status: Completed
- Type: class A office, luxury hotel, serviced residences, retail stores
- Location: Songdo IBD, Songdo International City, Incheon Free Economic Zone, Incheon; South Korea
- Coordinates: 37°23′21.00″N 126°38′38.00″E
- Groundbreaking: July 2006
- Construction started: February 1, 2007
- Opening: July 10, 2014

Height
- Architectural: 305 m (1,001 ft)
- Top floor: 276.7 m (908 ft)
- Observatory: 276.7 m (908 ft)

Technical details
- Floor count: 68
- Floor area: 140,000 square metres (1,506,947 sq ft)
- Lifts/elevators: 22

Design and construction
- Architects: Kohn Pedersen Fox/Heerim Architects & Engineers
- Developer: Gale International/Daewoo E&C/POSCO E&C

The Posco Tower-Songdo or Northeast Asia Trade Tower (Korean: 포스코타워-송도) is a skyscraper in Songdo International City, the world's most expensive private real estate project in the Incheon Free Economic Zone, South Korea. As of January 2025, the 305-metre (1,001 ft) building is South Korea's sixth tallest, and has 68 floors. It surpassed the previous record-holder, Samsung Tower Palace 3 – Tower G in Seoul, when it topped-out in 2009. Although finished in 2011, the completion of its interior had been delayed due to financial complications during a recession. It was surpassed in height in 2017 by the current highest building in South Korea, the Lotte World Tower.

The building was intended to be a landmark of the Songdo International Business District which was constructed on unused land along the waterfront near Incheon. It features 19 floors of class A office space, an observatory on the 65th-floor, a luxury hotel, serviced residences, and retail stores. The column-free floors include an office lobby at ground level with French limestone floors and Vermont slate stone walls.

== Design ==
Like One World Trade Center, the tower features a faceted glass facade that gently tapers from a square base but transitions to a triangular rooftop. The offices, apartments and a hotel each have their own entrance lobby. The facade is made of high-performance glazed glass with exterior shading devices which allows the structure to regulate internal temperatures. The tower also features low-flow plumbing fixtures allowing reduced water usage by more than 20 percent compared to the average consumption rate of a typical office building. In addition, a graywater collection system is used to flush wastewater while collected stormwater is stored and reused, reducing water consumption by more than 50 percent.

== Amenities ==
The building is next to Songdo Convensia, the Riverstone shopping center, and the Sheraton Incheon Hotel. It has an extensive parking station next door, and will have pedestrian access to a future subway station.

Floors 2 to 33 are occupied by several businesses, with Daewoo occupying levels 9 to 21. The 36th and 37th floors are allocated for banquets, restaurants, meeting rooms and other formal activities, while floors 38 to 64 features a residence hotel with 423 guest rooms, including a penthouse on the upper floor. In February 2010, the 65th-floor observatory temporarily opened to the public for the G-20 major economies meeting of finance ministers.

== Gallery ==
Panorama of Incheon with Posco Tower-Songdo at center

Street-level view of building

== See also ==
- List of tallest buildings in Incheon
- List of tallest buildings in South Korea
