= Incheon National University =

National university of South Korea

Coordinates: 37°22′31″N 126°37′59″E

- 인천대학교
- Motto: Global talent to the Future leaders
- Type: National
- Established: January 10, 1979
- President: Lee In-Jae
- Faculty: 495 (2020)
- Administrative staff: 683 (2020)
- Undergraduates: 11,776 (2020)
- Postgraduates: 1,434 (2020)
- Location: (Songdo-dong) 119 Academy-ro, Yeonsu-gu, Incheon, South Korea
- Campus: Urban
- Nickname: INU
- Mascot: Hwaetbul
- Website: www.inu.ac.kr www.inu.ac.kr/inuengl/index.do (in English)

Korean name
- Hangul: 인천대학교
- Hanja: 仁川大學校
- RR: Incheon daehakgyo
- MR: Inch'ŏn taehakkyo

Incheon National University (INU; Korean: 인천대학교), previously also known as University of Incheon (UI), is a national university in Incheon, South Korea. It is located in Songdo International Business District in Incheon Free Economic Zone (IFEZ). The university operates the main campus Songdo, and satellite campuses in Michuhol and Dohwa-dong.

== Brief history ==
INU was originally founded as a private college known as the Incheon Technical College in January 1979 as a part of Sunin Academy. Later, it was renamed Incheon College in December 1979 before it was chartered as a comprehensive four-year university in 1988. In 1994, the university was renamed to University of Incheon, which was a municipality-funded university. INU was relocated from Dohwa-dong in Nam-gu to a new location at Songdo in 2009. In February 2009, Incheon Institute for Korean Language Studies was opened. Also In July 2009, construction of Sondgo campus (Main Campus) was completed. In 2010, the university merged with Incheon City College, resulting in expanded educational offer. In February 2013, the university was nationalized and renamed as the Incheon National University.

== Campus ==
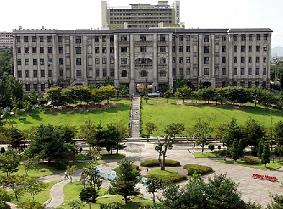
Previous Campus in Dohwa

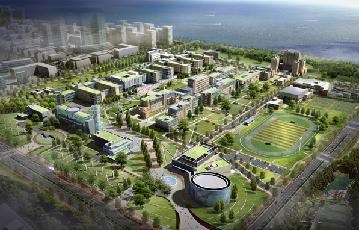
New Songdo Campus

Incheon National University's campus is located in Songdo.

== Academics ==
=== Undergraduate schools ===
UI's 65 academic departments and programs are organized into 11 colleges and schools.

- College of Humanities
  - Dept. of Korean Language and Literature
  - Dept. of English Language and Literature
  - Dept. of German Language and Literature
  - Dept. of French Language and Literature
  - Dept. of Japanese Language and Literature
  - Dept. of Chinese Language and Cultural Studies
- College of Natural Sciences
  - Dept. of Mathematics
  - Dept. of Physics
  - Dept. of Chemistry
  - Dept. of Consumer and Child Studies
  - Dept. of Fashion and Industry
  - Dept. of Marine Science
- College of Social Science
  - Dept. of Mass Communication
  - Dept. of Library and Information Science
  - Dept. of Creative Human Resource Development
  - Dept. of Social Welfare
- College of Law, Commerce, and Public Affairs
  - Dept. of Public Administrations
  - Dept. of Political Science & International Relations
  - Dept. of Law
  - Dept. of Economics
  - Division of International Trade
- College of Engineering
  - Dept. of Energy and Chemical Engineering
  - Dept. of Electrical Engineering
  - Dept. of Electronics Engineering
  - Dept. of Industrial and Management Engineering
  - Dept. of Materials Science and Engineering
  - Dept. of Vehicle Engineering
  - Dept. of Mechanical Engineering and Robotics
  - Dept. of Mechatronics
  - Dept. of Safety Engineering
- College of Information Technology
  - Dept. of Computer Science and Engineering
  - Dept. of Information Telecommunication Engineering
  - Dept. of Embedded-Systems Engineering
- College of Business
  - Division of Business Administration
  - Dept. of Tax and Accounting
- College of Arts and Physical Education
  - Major of Korean Painting
  - Major of Painting
  - Division of Design
  - Dept. of Performing Arts
  - Division of Sport Science
  - Division of Health and Exercise Science
- College of Education
  - Dept. of Early Childhood Education
  - Dept. of Korean Language Education
  - Dept. of English Language Education
  - Dept. of Japanese Language Education
  - Dept. of Mathematics Education
  - Dept. of Physical Education
  - Dept. of History Education
  - Dept. of Ethics Education
- College of Urban Sciences
  - Dept. of Urban Policy and Administration
  - Dept. of Civil and Environmental Engineering
  - Dept. of Environmental Engineering
  - Dept. of Urban Construction Engineering
  - Major of Architecture
  - Major of Urban Planning
  - Major of Architectural Engineering
- College of Life Sciences and Bioengineering
  - Major of Biological Sciences
  - Major of Bioengineering
  - Major of Molecular and Medical Science
  - Major of Nano-Bioengineering
- College of Northeast Asian Studies
  - Korean Trade and Commerce
  - Northeast Asian Trade and Commerce
    - Chinese Trade and Commerce
    - Japanese Trade and Commerce
    - Russian Trade and Commerce
    - U.S. Trade and Commerce

=== Graduate schools ===
Established on November 27, 1984, the Graduate School currently includes 35 masters and 28 doctoral degree programs.

- Graduate School of Education
  - Educational Sciences
    - Educational Administration
    - Educational Technology
    - Early Childhood Education
    - Curriculum and Instruction
    - Counseling Psychology
    - Gifted Education
  - Language and Literature
    - Korean Education
    - English Education
    - German Education
    - French Education
    - Japanese Education
  - Natural Sciences
    - Mathematics Education
    - Physics Education
    - Biology Education
    - Home Economics Education
  - Arts and Physical Area
    - Arts Education
    - Physical Education
  - Social Sciences
    - Ethics Education
    - Social Studies Education
    - Business Education
  - Engineering
    - Mechanical Education
    - Electrical Education
    - Electronics Education
    - Architectural Education
    - Materials Science and Engineering Education
    - Computer Science Education
- Graduate School of Public Administration
  - Public Administration
  - Judicial Administration
  - Crisis Management
  - Social Welfare
  - Legislative and Security studies
- Graduate School of Logistics
  - Master’s Programs
    - Logistics Management
    - Logistics System
  - PhD Programs
    - Logistics Management
    - Logistics System
- Graduate School of Engineering
  - Mechanical Engineering
  - Electrical Engineering
  - Textile and Fashion Industry
  - Industrial Engineering
  - Safety and Environmental System Engineering
  - Industrial Design
  - Civil and Environmental System Engineering
  - Architectural Engineering
  - Advanced Materials Engineering
- Graduate School
  - Master's Degree Programs
    - Korean Language and Literature
    - Korean as a second language
    - English and Literature
    - German Language and Literature
    - French Language and Literature
    - Japanese and Literature
    - Chinese Cultural Studies
    - Ethics
    - Law
    - Public Administration
    - Political Science & International Studies
    - Mass Communication
    - Business Administration
    - International Trade
    - Economics
    - Northeast Asian Trade and Commerce
    - Mathematics
    - Physics
    - Chemistry
    - Biology
    - Home Management
    - Clothing and Textiles
    - Mechanical Engineering
    - Electrical Engineering
    - Electronics Engineering
    - Civil and Environmental Engineering
    - Architectural Engineering
    - Industrial and Management Engineering
    - Computer Science and Engineering
    - Materials Science and Engineering
    - Information and Telecommunication Engineering
    - Embedded Systems Engineering
    - Safety Engineering
    - Physical Education
    - Fine Arts
- Graduate School
  - Doctoral Degree Programs
    - Korean Language and Literature
    - Korean as a second language
    - English Language and Literature
    - Japanese Language and Literature
    - Education
    - Law
    - Public Administration
    - Political Science & International Studies
    - Mass Communication
    - Business Administration
    - International Trade
    - Economics
    - Northeast Asian Trade and Commerce
    - Mathematics
    - Physics
    - Chemistry
    - Biology
    - Clothing and Textiles
    - Mechanical Engineering
    - Electrical Engineering
    - Electronics Engineering
    - Civil and Environmental Engineering
    - Architectural Engineering
    - Industrial and Management Engineering
    - Computer Science and Engineering
    - Information and Telecommunication Engineering
    - Safety Engineering
    - Physical Education
- Graduate School of Business Administration
  - Business Administration
  - Real Estate
- Graduate School of Information Technology
  - Computer Science and Engineering
  - Information and Telecommunications Engineering

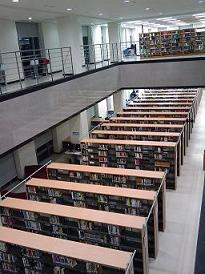
Haksan Library

=== Ranking ===
- 4th national university in Korea from 2022 JoongAng Ilbo university ranking (Overall category).
- 3rd for creating and supporting start-up from 2022 JoongAng Ilbo university ranking (Student start-up category).
- 18th most innovative university in the world, and 2nd in South Korea from 2023 World Universities of Real Impact (WURI) ranking.
- 1st for creating student-driven start-ups among national universities and 8th among all universities in Korea from 2020 Korea Economic Daily.

== Office of International Affairs and Korean Language Institute ==
The Office of International Affairs provides opportunities to learn through Student Exchange Program, Short-term language training programs globalizing the university through expanding sister relationships with the universities whole over the world. Web site of Office of International

The Korean language program was founded for the purpose of teaching the Korean language to foreigners and Korean students from overseas. The Incheon Institute for Korean Language Studies focuses on the linguistic abilities of speaking, listening, reading, and writing and offers opportunities to experience a taste of Korean history, culture, and society together with the Korean language. The institute consists of certified teachers with graduate school education and vital experience teaching. Students from over the world, including China, Mongolia, Thailand, Canada, and The United States, are currently registered for classes and are studying the Korean language.

== Confucius Institute ==
Confucius Institute at Incheon National University is supported by the Chinese government. The Chinese government has been supporting language institutes around the world for the spread of the Chinese language and culture. In Korea, the Chinese government has selected Incheon National University and has given support in the established of a Confucius Institute. The educated curriculum receives academic guidance of the Chinese Education Ministry.

== Industry-Academy Cooperation Foundation ==
The Industry-Academy Cooperation Foundation (IACF) of Incheon National University was established in May 2004 as a special corporation. Its purpose is to collaborate with industry in cultivation human resources with creative minds, promoting industry-oriented education and to develop new knowledge and technology for the improvement of industry, and with the profits from intellectual property to provide financial assistance for education and research.

== INU Holdings ==
INU Holdings is a technology holdings company which deals with technologies developed by students and professors of Incheon National University. So far, INU Holdings is the 6th technology holdings company of a university in Korea. It was opened last year and so far has established 3 subsidiary companies. It has strong cooperation with the IACF.

=== Green Pioneer Co. ===
Green Pioneer started as a spin-off company established by a professor of biology in UI with the support from school. Now, it is a subsidiary company of INU Holdings. Its key business facets are distribution of photosynthesis assessment instruments (PAM) and biokits. It also obtains an ISO listed technology in the field of toxicology.

== Notable people ==
- Kim Kyo-Heung, politician, Member of Parliament, Secretary General of the National Assembly
- Bae Jin-Gyo, politician, Member of Parliament
- Lee Dong-Joo, politician, Member of Parliament
- Park Chang-kyu, politician, Incheon Metropolitan City Council
- Che Sun-Joo, business woman, CCO, Naver
- Joo Jin-mo, actor
- Jung Suk-won, actor
- Sunwoo Sun, actress
- Kim Da-Mi, actress
- Lee Sun-hee, singer
- Lee So-Ra, singer
- Jang Min-hee, sports archer, 2020 Tokyo Olympic Gold medallist

== See also ==
- List of national universities in South Korea
- List of universities and colleges in South Korea
- Education in Korea
