= Extrastatecraft =

Extrastatecraft also sometimes referred to as extra-statecraft, is a term that refers to the activities that a state or government undertakes, statecraft, through means that are beyond entities belonging to the state.

Extrastatecraft is a reflection on the strategy used by modern governments to achieve their goals without using state resources or entities. With extrastatecraft, the state makes use of the private sector, public spaces or infrastructure in order to achieve its goals, whatever they may be in a particular situation. Achieving the goals of statecraft with "resources beyond that which explicitly belong to the state."

== Origin ==
The term was coined by Keller Easterling, and is explained in her 2014 book Extrastatecraft: The Power of Infrastructure Space. The extra is added onto statecraft because of the cross-border nature and being beyond 'traditional structures of political control' imposed over space and time. It is sometimes written extra-statecraft.

== History ==
Free-trade zone/Export-processing zone which she refers to simple as "The Zone". The zone is a phenomenon that has existed since ancient times till now. In the ancient times it was for example the Roman port of Delos and today is city like Hong Kong or other tariff free trade zones across the world. According to Easterling, the Zone is the phenomena of extrastatecraft manifested spatially. Some describe the zones ae experiments in extrastatecraft and refer to the examples of Singapore, Dubai and Chinese Special Economic Zones, such as Gwadar Port. Another example is New Songdo City, part of the Incheon Free Economic Zone.
