= Jack Nicklaus Golf Club Korea =

Coordinates: 37.380°N 126.624°E

- 잭 니클라우스 골프클럽 코리아
- Interactive map of the Jack Nicklaus Golf Club Korea area

General information
- Status: Completed
- Type: Golf Course
- Location: Songdo IBD, Songdo International City, Incheon Free Economic Zone, Incheon, South Korea
- Opening: October 2010, 16 years ago

Technical details
- Floor area: 10.19 million sf (Championship golf course)

Design and construction
- Architect: Jack Nicklaus Design / EDSA / Heerim
- Developer: Gale International, POSCO E&C

Location in South Korea

Jack Nicklaus Golf Club Korea (Korean: 잭 니클라우스 골프클럽 코리아) in Incheon, South Korea, is an 18-hole championship golf course designed by Nicklaus Design, headed by Jack Nicklaus. It is the focal point of Songdo IBD's environmentally focused green space program.

Opened in 2011, from the back tees, the course exceeds 7,400 yards (6,770 m) and presents a challenge to even the most talented golfers. Within the golf course, there is a Western-style fairway community, including 151 detached single family villas.

== Events ==
The club hosted the eleventh Presidents Cup in 2015, the first held in Asia. Before it officially opened, it was the site of a Champions Tour tournament in September 2010, the Posco E&C Songdo Championship, a first for that tour in Asia. A second edition was played in 2011, as the Songdo IBD Championship. The International Crown, an eight-nation team event on the LPGA Tour, was hosted by the club in 2018 for the first time outside the United States. LIV Golf Korea was held here in 2025.

== Scorecard ==
Jack Nicklaus Golf Club Korea
Tee	Rating/Slope	1	2	3	4	5	6	7	8	9	Out	10	11	12	13	14	15	16	17	18	In	Total
Par		4	4	5	4	3	4	5	3	4	36	4	4	4	3	4	5	4	3	5	36	72
Black		428	426	593	386	172	487	559	235	451	3737	447	435	466	208	372	577	480	203	545	3733	7470
Blue		378	415	547	332	151	471	526	193	431	3444	423	413	446	182	340	533	460	187	506	3490	6934
White		359	377	529	317	136	439	505	175	402	3239	378	365	402	166	322	520	409	164	490	3216	6455
Gold		343	363	513	317	115	390	483	138	363	3025	358	321	359	150	284	487	346	145	417	2867	5892
Red		293	313	438	273	115	353	440	138	318	2681	306	278	312	125	257	442	346	125	407	2598	5279
SI		17	15	9	11	13	1	5	7	3		6	10	14	18	12	2	4	16	8
