= Songdo Convensia =

Convention center in Songdo IBD, South Korea

- 송도컨벤시아
- Interactive map of the Songdo Convensia area

General information
- Status: Completed
- Type: Convention Center
- Location: Songdo IBD; Songdo International City, Incheon Free Economic Zone, Incheon; South Korea
- Coordinates: 37°23′20.7″N 126°38′46.3″E
- Estimated completion: October 2008

Technical details
- Floor area: 582,939 sf

Design and construction
- Architects: Kohn Pedersen Fox, BAUM
- Developer: Gale International, POSCO E&C

The Songdo Convensia Convention Center is the first project completed in Songdo IBD and opened for business on October 7, 2008. Its innovative design by KPF and Baum elicits thoughts of the Sydney Opera House and is already a landmark structure in Korea. The main exhibition hall has one of the largest column-free spans (472.4 ft) in Asia. Donated to the City of Incheon by Gale International and POSCO E&C and managed by Incheon Tourism Organization, Songdo Convensia now hosts international conferences, trade shows and meetings, and has even become a popular filming location for commercials and music videos.

Facilities available at Songdo Convensia include two main exhibition halls, 23 conference rooms and 3 ballrooms. Some of the support facilities at Songdo Convensia include wireless internet capabilities throughout the entire convention center, RFID card systems, voice recognition cameras, and interpretation in 8 languages.

Recently, Songdo Convensia received LEED New Construction 2.2 Certified rating, and become the first convention facility to be LEED certified in Asia.

== Popular culture ==
Songdo Convensia was used as the main filming location in episode 81 of the South Korean variety show Running Man filmed in 2012.

Songdo Convensia was used as the main filming location in episodes 12 to 15 of the South Korean survival show Loud filmed live from August 21 to September 11, 2021.

== 2014 Asian Games IBC/MBC ==
Songdo Convensia was used as the location of the media center and International Broadcast Center for 2014 Asian Games.

== 2023 Rubik's Cube World Championships ==
Songdo Convensia is the chosen venue for the biannual 2023 Rubik's Cube World Championships. It is being organized by Korea Cube Culture United, Rubik's and the WCA, also known as the World Cube Association. The event will happen from 12 to 15 August 2023.
