= Lotte Biologics =

South Korean biotechnology company

LOTTE BIOLOGICS
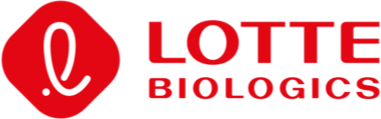
- Native name: 롯데바이오로직스
- Industry: Biotechnology
- Founded: 7 June 2022; 4 years ago
- Headquarters: Seoul, South Korea
- Number of employees: 128 (2023)
- Parent: Lotte Corporation
- Website: www.lottebiologics.com/ko/

Lotte Biologics (Korean: 롯데바이오로직스) is a South Korean biotechnology company headquartered in Seoul.

== History ==
In May 2022, Lotte Group entered the bio industry in earnest by acquiring Bristol Myers Squibb's biopharmaceutical plant with a production capacity of 40,000L. In June, Lotte Biologics was established as a subsidiary of Lotte Corporation.

In July 2023, construction began on the first biopharmaceutical plant in Songdo, Incheon, with the goal of completion in 2025 and operation in 2027. It is a project to build three factories with a production capacity of 120,000 L each by investing approximately 4.6 trillion won by 2030.
