= Songdo =

Smart city in Incheon, South Korea

Songdo 송도/松島
- International Business District
- Songdo International Business District
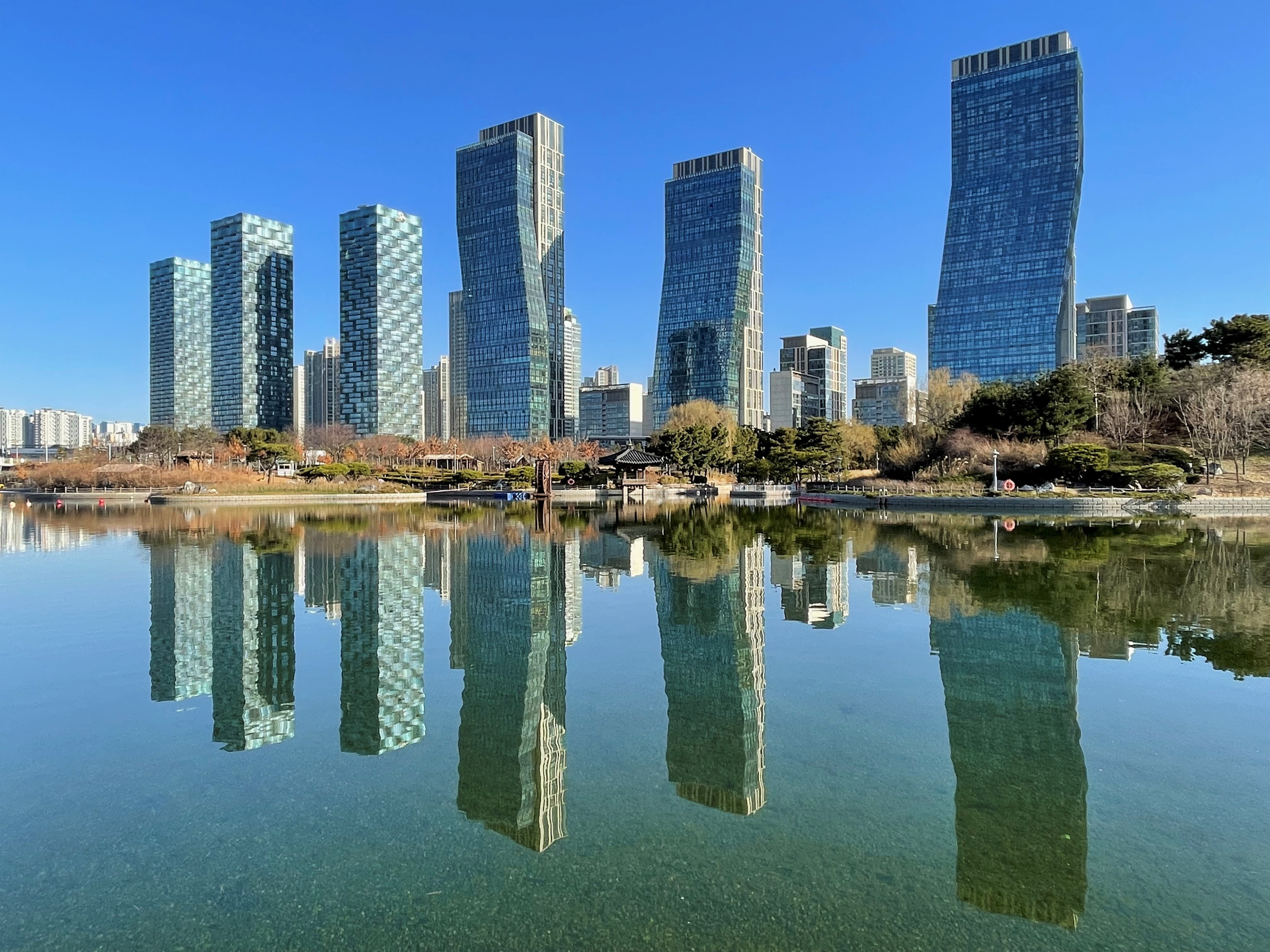
- The six Central Park Towers
- Interactive map of Songdo
- Coordinates: 37°23′06″N 126°38′42″E
- Country: South Korea
- Region: Seoul Capital Area
- Provincial level: Incheon

Area
  - Total: 53.4 km^{2} (20.6 sq mi)

Population (2020)
  - Total: 167,346
- Time zone: UTC+9 (Korea Standard Time)

Songdo (Korean: 송도), officially known as Songdo International Business District (Songdo IBD), is a smart city built on 600 ha (1,500 acres) of an artificial island off the coast of Incheon's waterfront, 30 km (19 mi) southwest of Seoul, South Korea. It is connected to Incheon International Airport by a 12.3 km (7.6 mi) reinforced concrete highway bridge called Incheon Bridge. Along with Yeongjong and Cheongna, it is part of the Incheon Free Economic Zone.

The Songdo smart city features amenities across the district. Homages to international architectural hallmarks, such as New York City's Central Park and Venice's waterways, are planned to be incorporated. Many of the existing buildings were constructed as LEED-certified space, the green building certification of the United States Green Building Council.

Songdo is a community of 167,000 residents located within one of three Free Economic Zones in Incheon. The project has been approximately 86% completed. Aside from residential areas, the location is also home to a Global Campus, Pharma Hub, Startup Center, and international organizations such as the Green Climate Fund. Construction started in 2003 and is expected to finish in 2030.

== Development ==
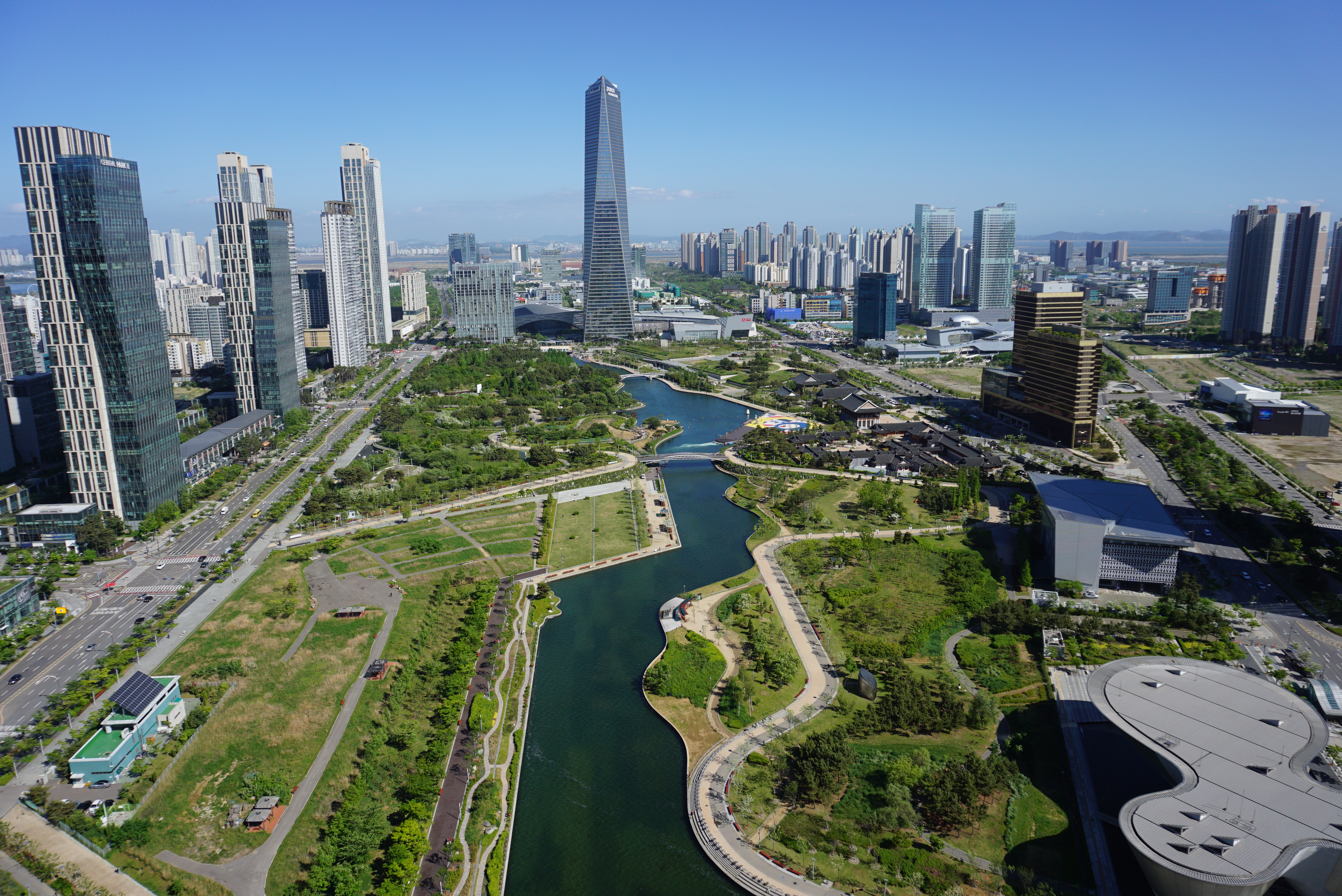
Songdo Central Park and Posco Tower Songdo

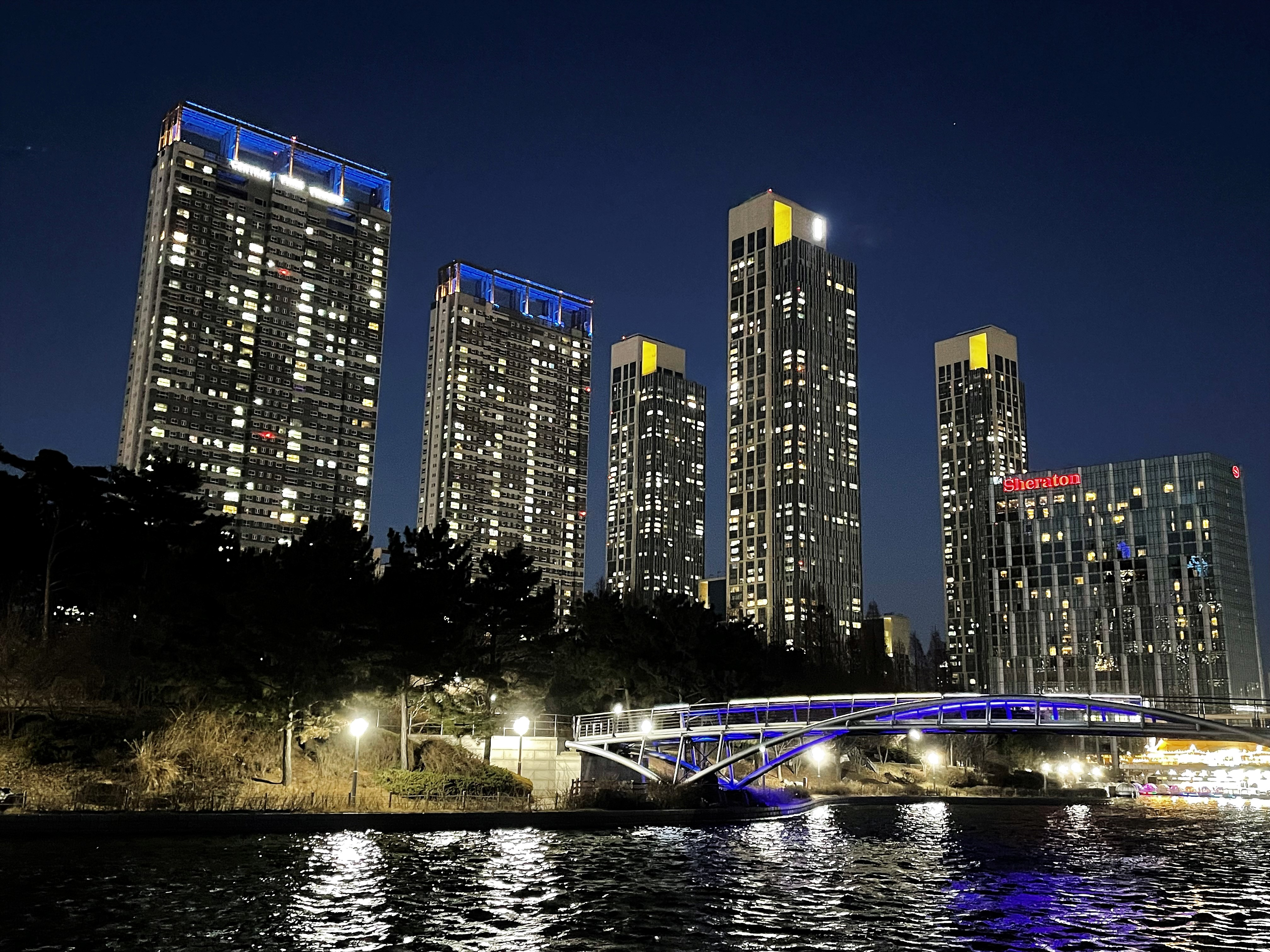
Songdo by night

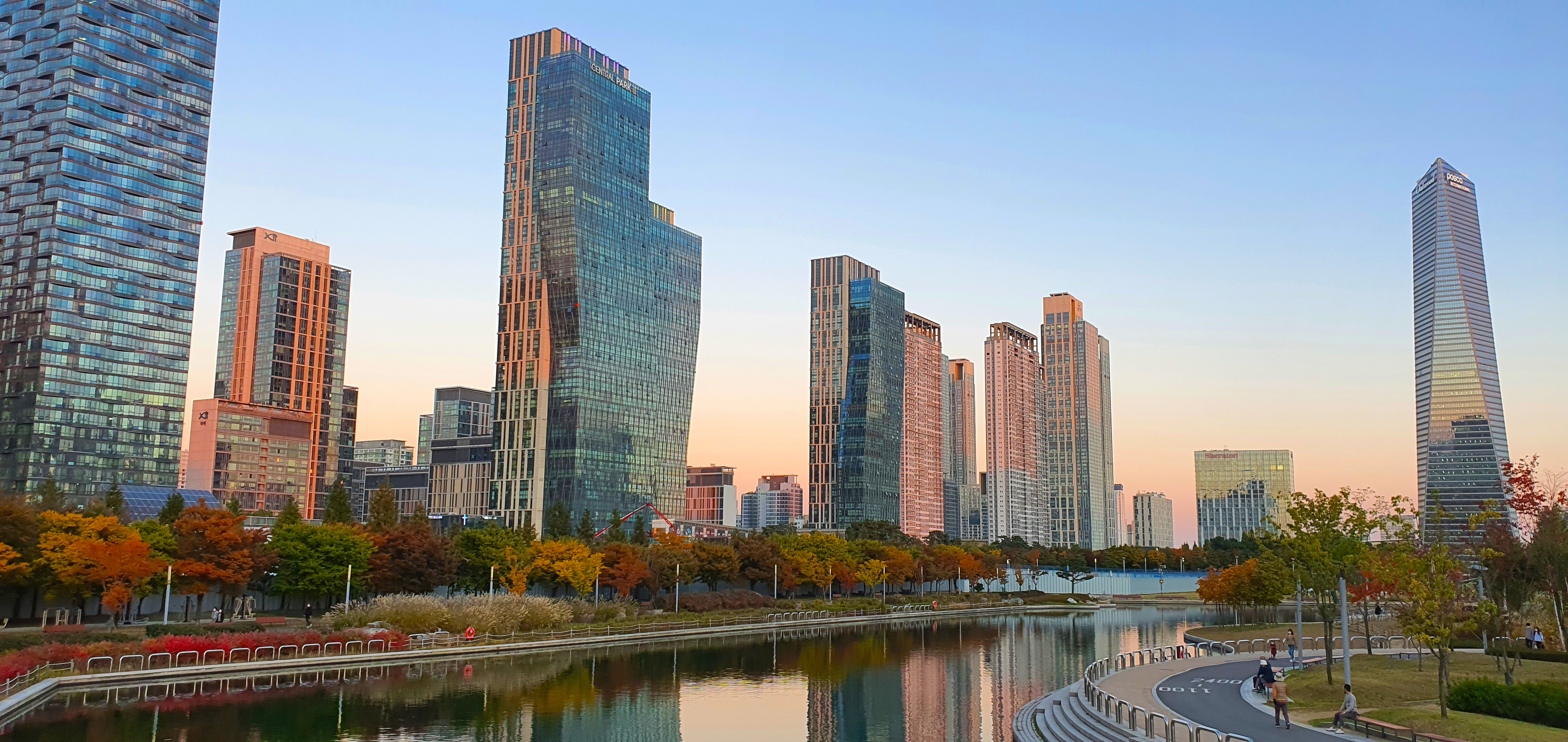
Architecture in Songdo IBD

The Artwin Prugio Towers

Built on 600 ha (1,500 acres) of land reclaimed from the Yellow Sea off Incheon, about 56 km (35 mi) from the South's capital Seoul, Songdo district was one the largest private real estate developments in history. By its completion date in 2015, the district was planned to contain 80,000 apartments, 5,000,000 m^{2} (50,000,000 sq ft) of office space, and 900,000 m^{2} (10,000,000 sq ft) of retail space. The 65-floor Northeast Asia Trade Tower became South Korea's tallest building. Computers have been built into the houses, streets, and offices as part of a wide area network.

The Songdo IBD was part of former President Lee Myung-bak's effort to promote green and low-carbon growth as an avenue for future development after 60 years of reliance on export-oriented manufacturing. The nation launched a $38 billion economic stimulus package in January 2009, with over 80% of the total earmarked for green investment. The Framework Act for Low Carbon Green Growth, passed by Korea's National Assembly in 2010, increased this to $83.6 billion spanning five years. Under this initiative, the Songdo IBD is being developed as a sustainable city with more than 40% of its area reserved for green space, including the park of 40 ha (100 acres), 26 km (16 mi) of bicycling lanes, numerous charging stations for electric vehicles and a waste collection system that eliminates the need for trash trucks. Also, it is the first district in Korea to have all of its major buildings on par or beyond LEED's requirements.

Three additional foreign university campuses opened in 2014, for a total of four total universities located within an international business district some 60 km (40 mi) from Seoul, including the first overseas university that opened in Korea, the State University of New York, Stony Brook. The schools will be funded by the Ministry of Knowledge Economy, the Incheon Free Economic Zone and the Incheon Metropolitan Government. The development is part of a $35 billion effort by the Korean government to form an international business district that houses competitive universities from around the world. In spring 2014, George Mason University (Fairfax, Virginia) opened its Korean campus in Songdo to support undergraduate academic interests and professional development programming for local corporations. Additionally, the University of Utah anticipated opening a satellite campus in March 2014 with several American bachelor's degrees offered in Social Sciences, along with an M.A. in Applied Linguistics.

== Sustainability ==
Though the city is not yet complete, Songdo IBD is home to 106 LEED certified buildings that fall under 12 projects, or 22 million sq ft of LEED-certified space. This number includes several 'firsts' for LEED in Korea and Asia, including the first LEED-certified hotel in Korea (the Sheraton Incheon), the first certified residential tower in Korea (Central Park 1), and the first certified convention hall in Asia (Convensia). The 50,000 sq ft clubhouse for the Jack Nicklaus Golf Club Korea which hosted the Presidents Cup in 2015 is also certified. Songdo IBD alone represents 40% of all LEED-certified space in South Korea.

In addition, Songdo IBD utilizes a pneumatic waste disposal system. This means no garbage cans on street corners, and no garbage trucks. Instead, garbage is thrown into pipes that will suck the garbage underground, disposing of waste, and recycling what can be recycled.

There are also 25 km of bike paths and charging stations for electric vehicles throughout the city.

There have been many criticisms of Songdo's sustainability credentials given the car-centricity of the city and the lack of walkability. Many of the LEED certified buildings also only meet the minimum criteria and many of the cities claims have been dismissed as greenwashing.

== UN Green Climate Fund ==
In October 2012, Songdo IBD was selected to become the home to the United Nations Green Climate Fund (GCF). One of the reasons for selection is the environmental-friendly practices that were incorporated into the city's foundation. Being selected for the GCF marked the first time a large global environmental agency would be hosted in Asia.

A parallel between the GCF and the World Bank can be drawn, as the GCF offers financial aid to developing countries in their quest to combat climate change. South Korea beat out 5 other competitors for this opportunity, as part of former South Korean President Lee Myung-Bak's initiative for green growth in Korea. The other competing countries were Germany, Switzerland, Mexico, Namibia, and Poland. According to Chief Secretary Kim Sang-hyup, the win for selection came at only 10 days before the decision was due, and mainly because the United States decided to lend its support to Korea.

== Transportation ==
Songdo IBD has wide roads and an extensive network of bicycle paths and walkways. The district is served by buses and Incheon Metro Line 1, which has six stations (another was scheduled to be added in 2021), some of which have elegant interiors and skylit interior spaces. Although travel to Incheon International Airport is relatively quick via the 12.3 km Incheon Bridgesubway travel to Seoul is less direct and requires multiple transfers. However, two Red-class commuter bus routes provide direct connections to the capital.

== Environmental impact ==
In 2003, Birds Korea called for a halt to the reclamation project due to concerns of potential losses of important tidal flats. Prior to reclamation, the Songdo tidal flats had supported several threatened waterbird species, and provided a staging ground for migratory waders as they traveled between the Northern and Southern hemispheres.

== Bio industry ==
Major South Korean bio companies, including Samsung Biologics and Celltrion, have their headquarters, and raw materials companies such as Merck & Co., Sartorius, Cytiva, and Thermo Fisher Scientific have large-scale research and development and manufacturing facilities. SK Bioscience has a large-scale R&D facility, and Lotte Biologics has a plant in Songdo. Lotte Biologics began construction of the plant for biopharmaceutical production in March 2024, and is scheduled to begin commercial production in 2027.

== Projects ==
- State University of New York (SUNY) – Korea (SBU, FIT)
- George Mason University Korea Campus
- Ghent University Global Campus
- University of Utah Asia Campus
- Yonsei University, International Campus
- Global Information Complex, Inha University
- Chadwick International
- First World
- Jack Nicklaus Golf Club Korea
- Northeast Asia Trade Tower
- Sheraton Incheon Hotel
- Songdo Canal Walk
- Songdo Convensia
- Songdo Central Park
- University of Incheon

== Gallery ==
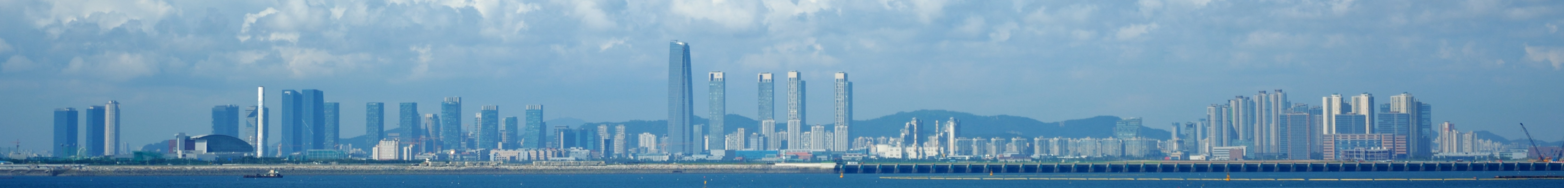
Songdo International Business District, Incheon.
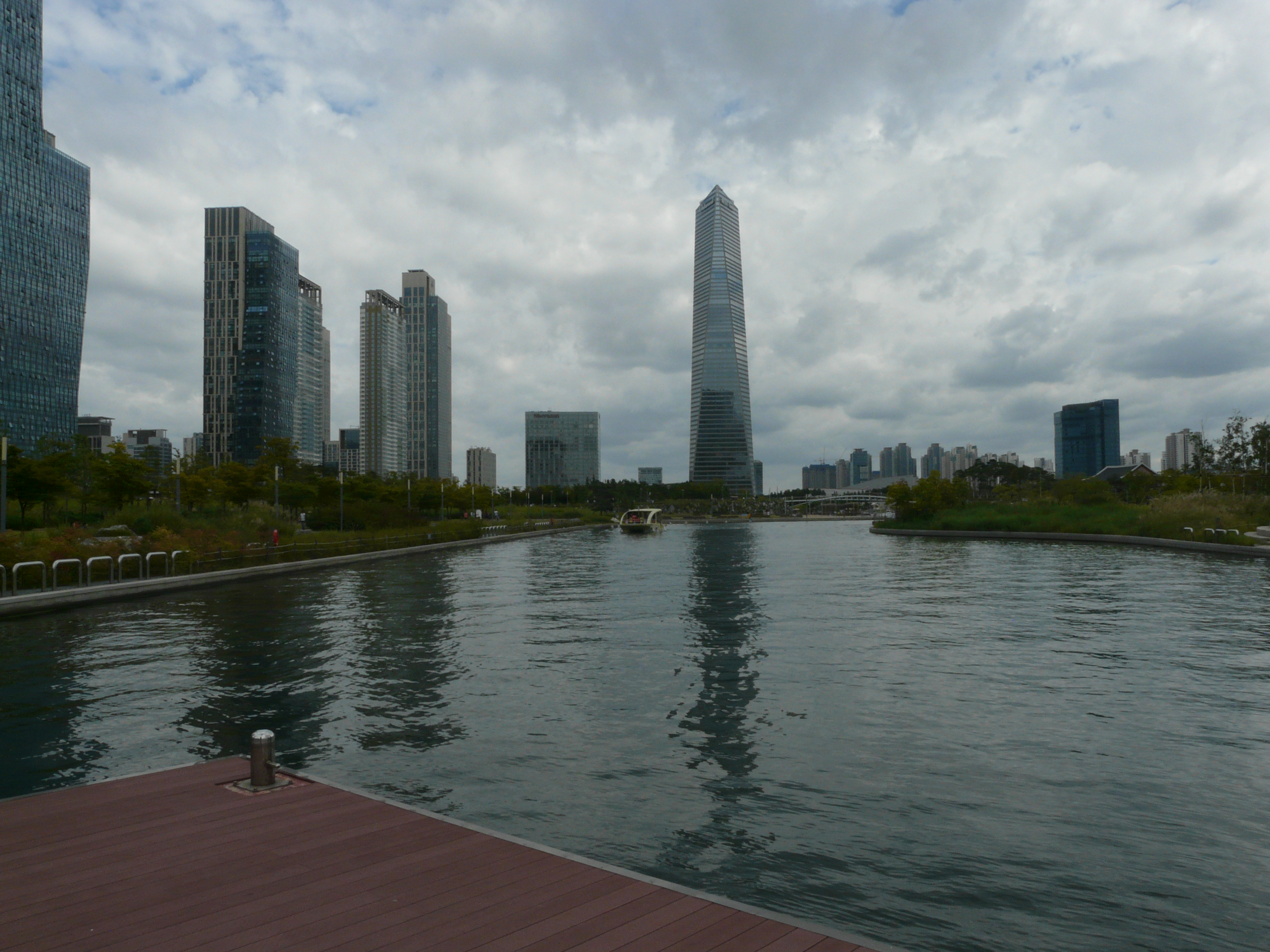

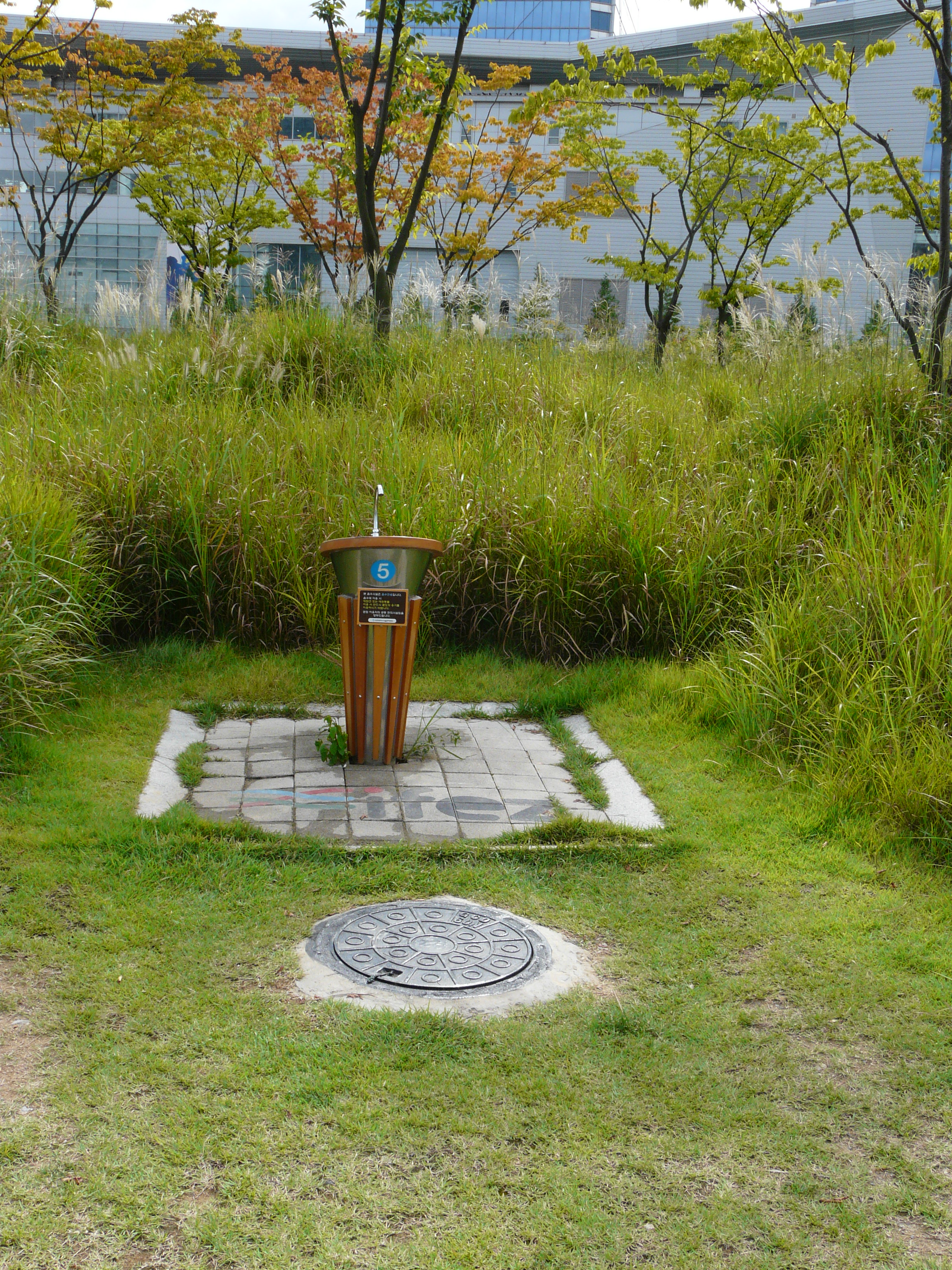

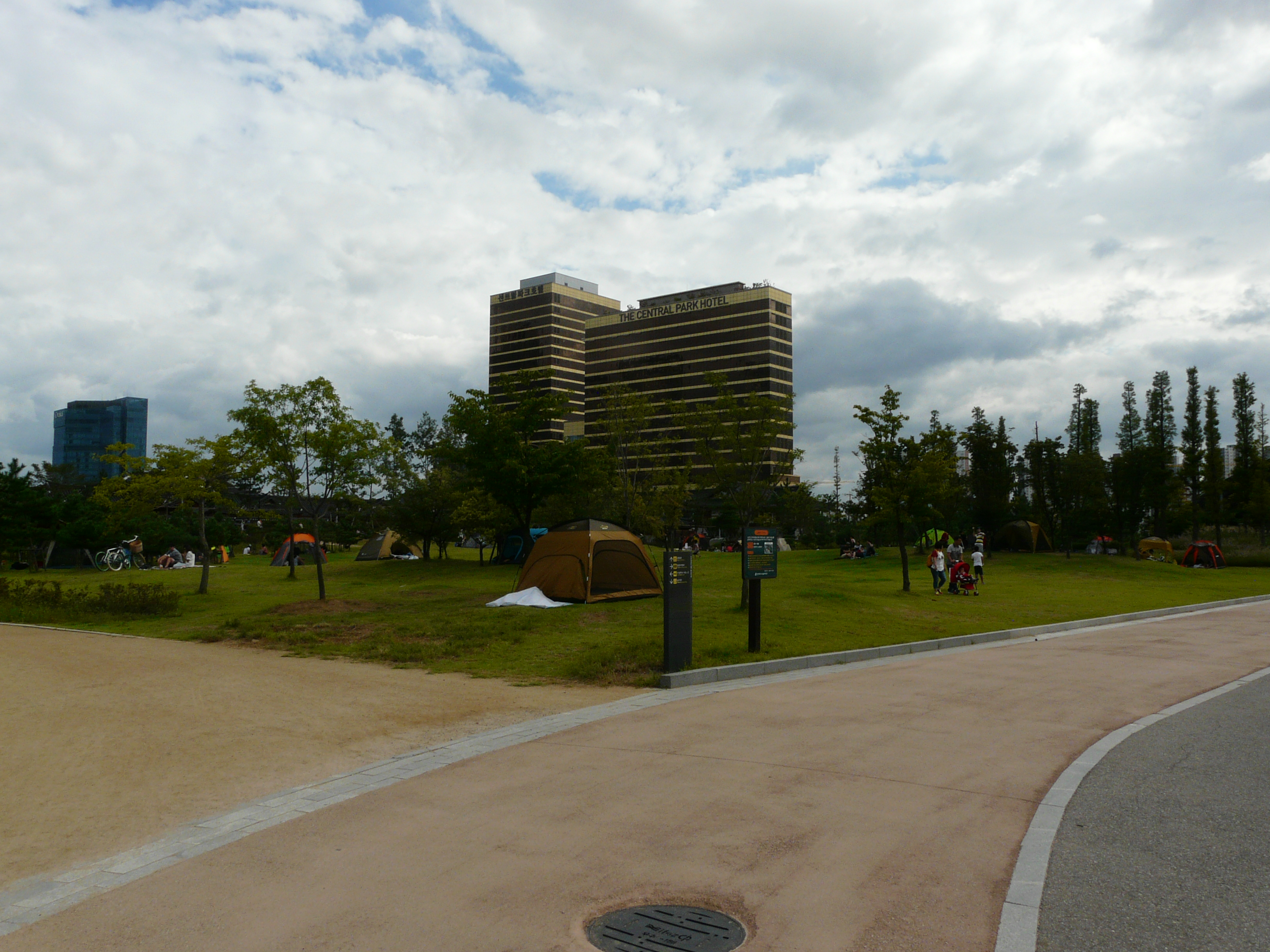

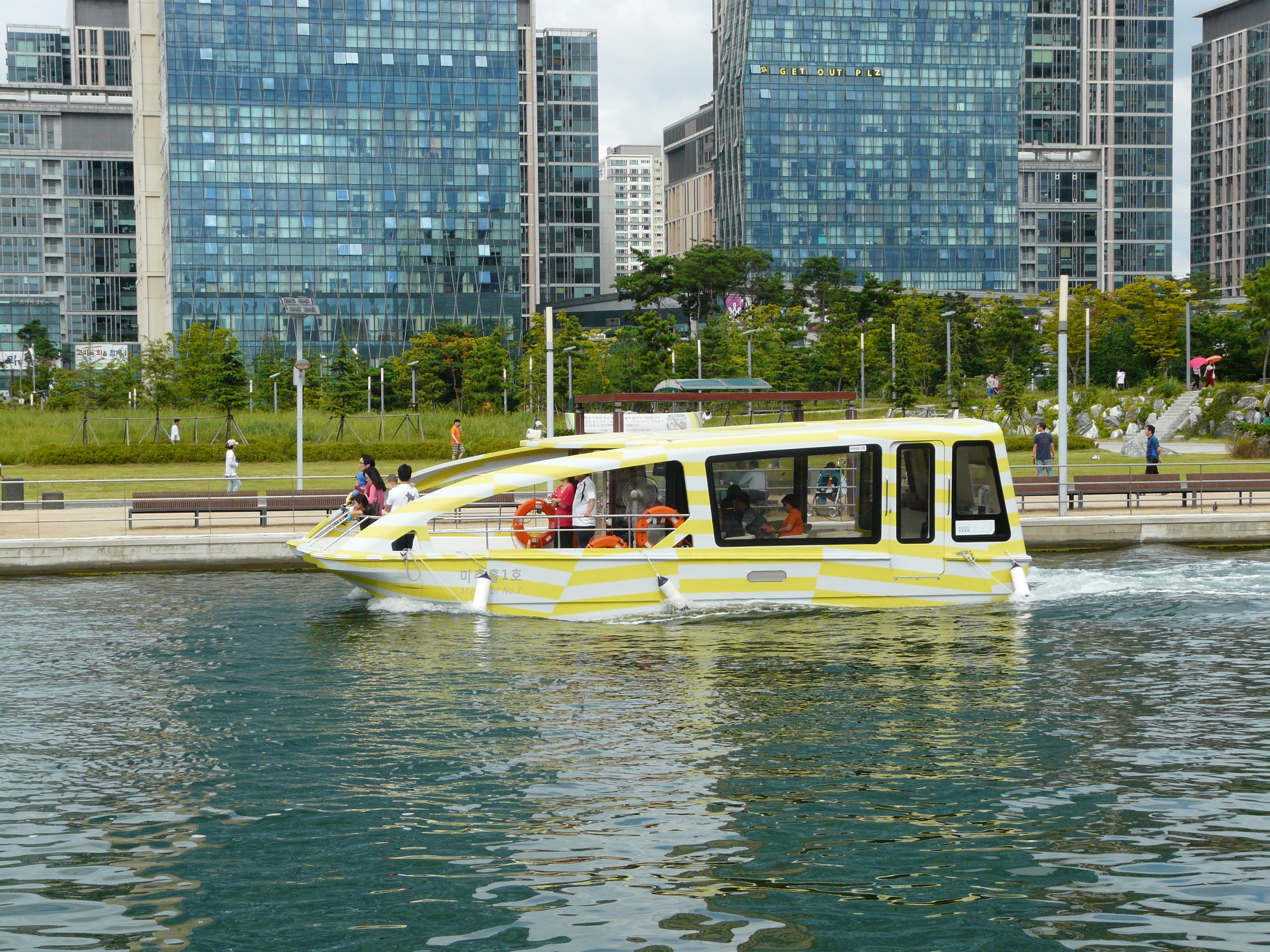

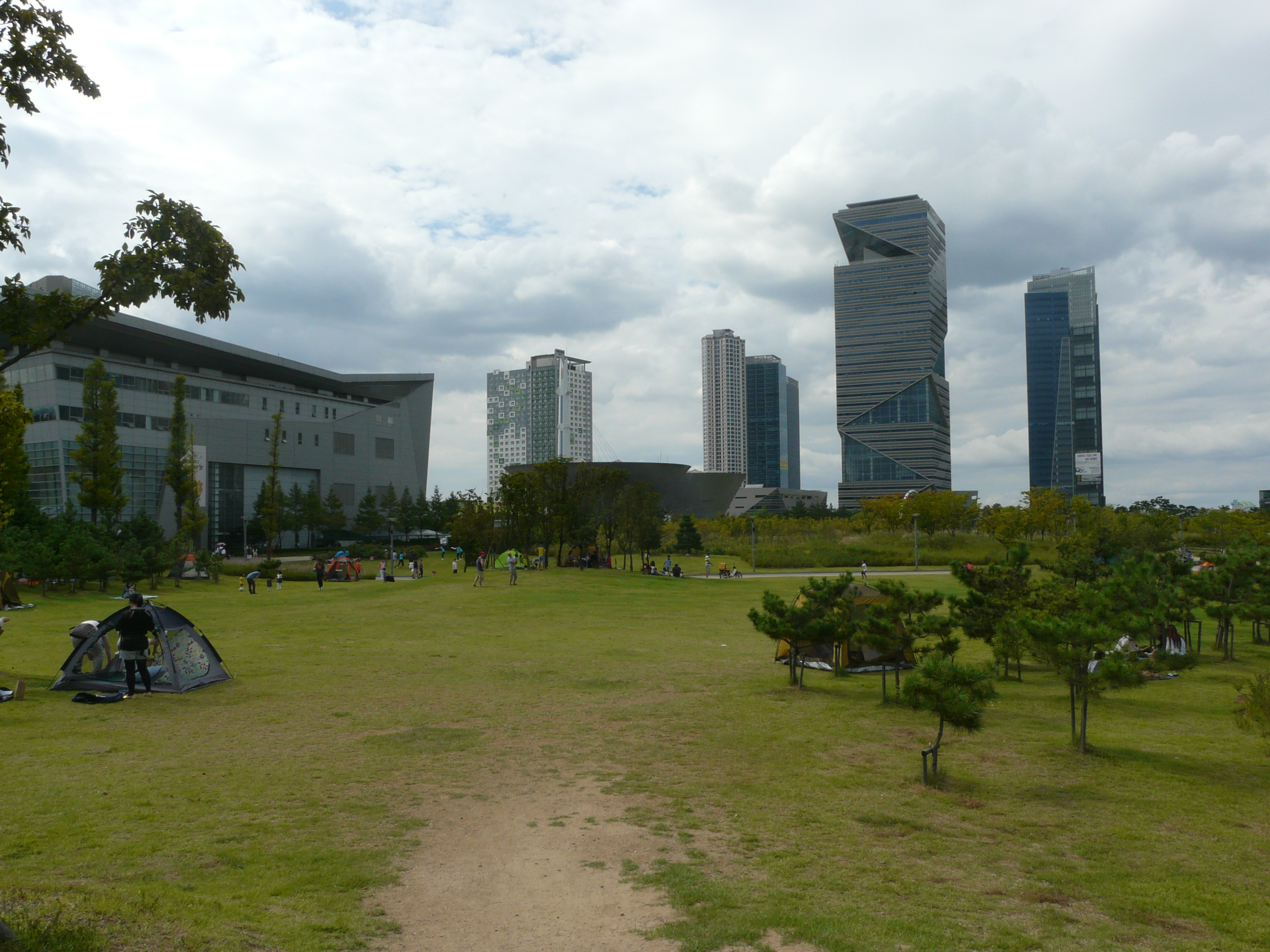

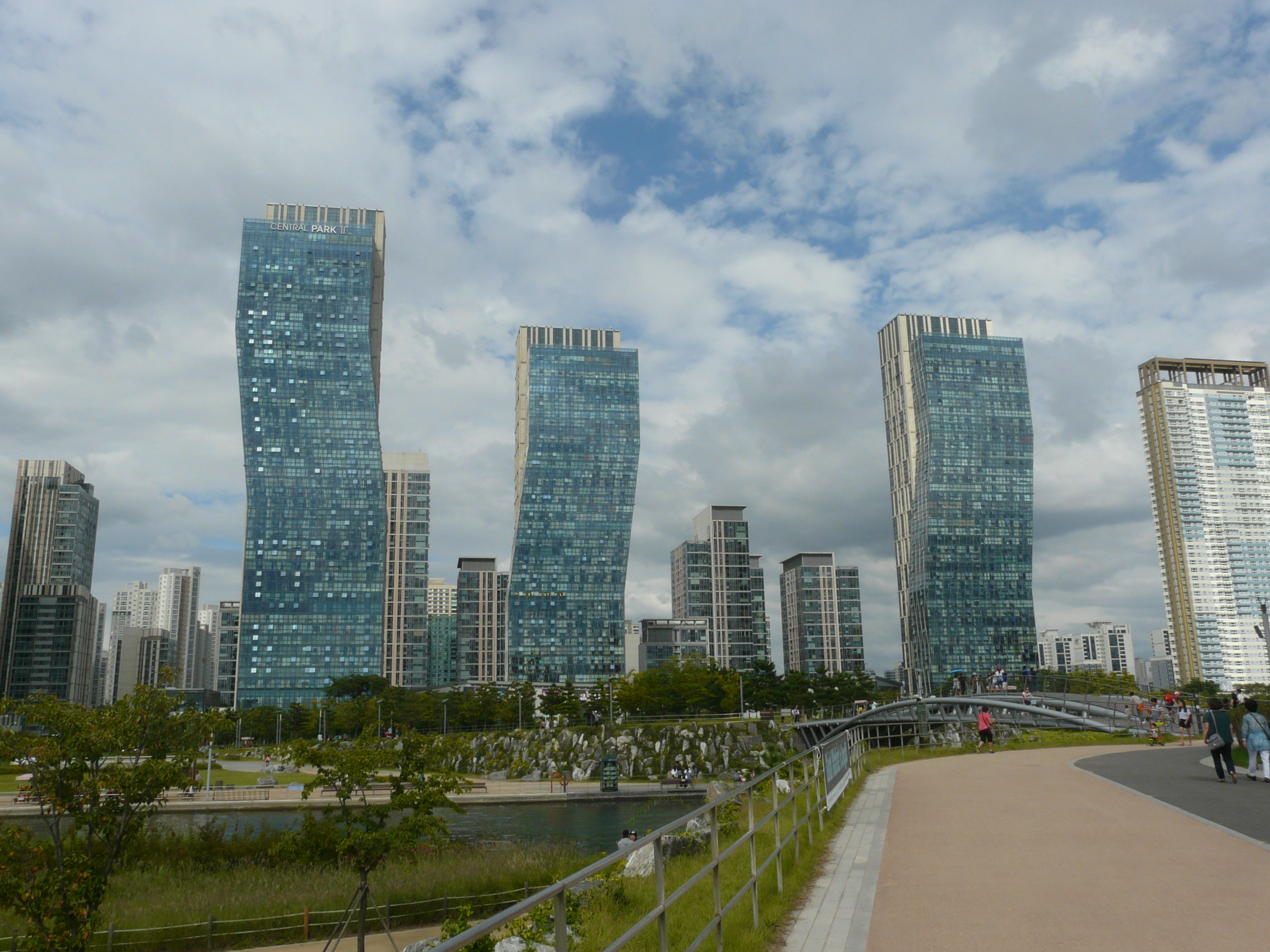

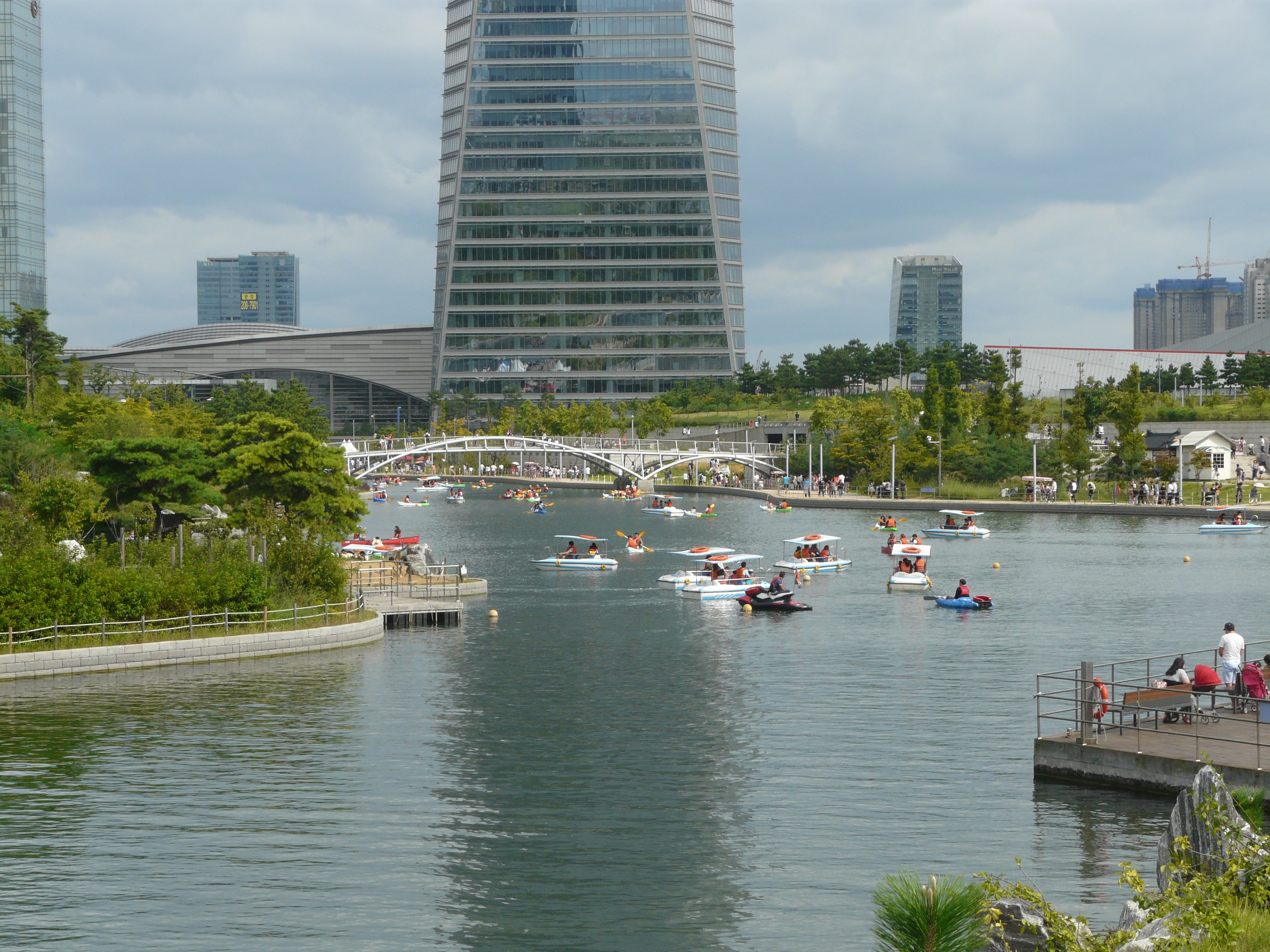

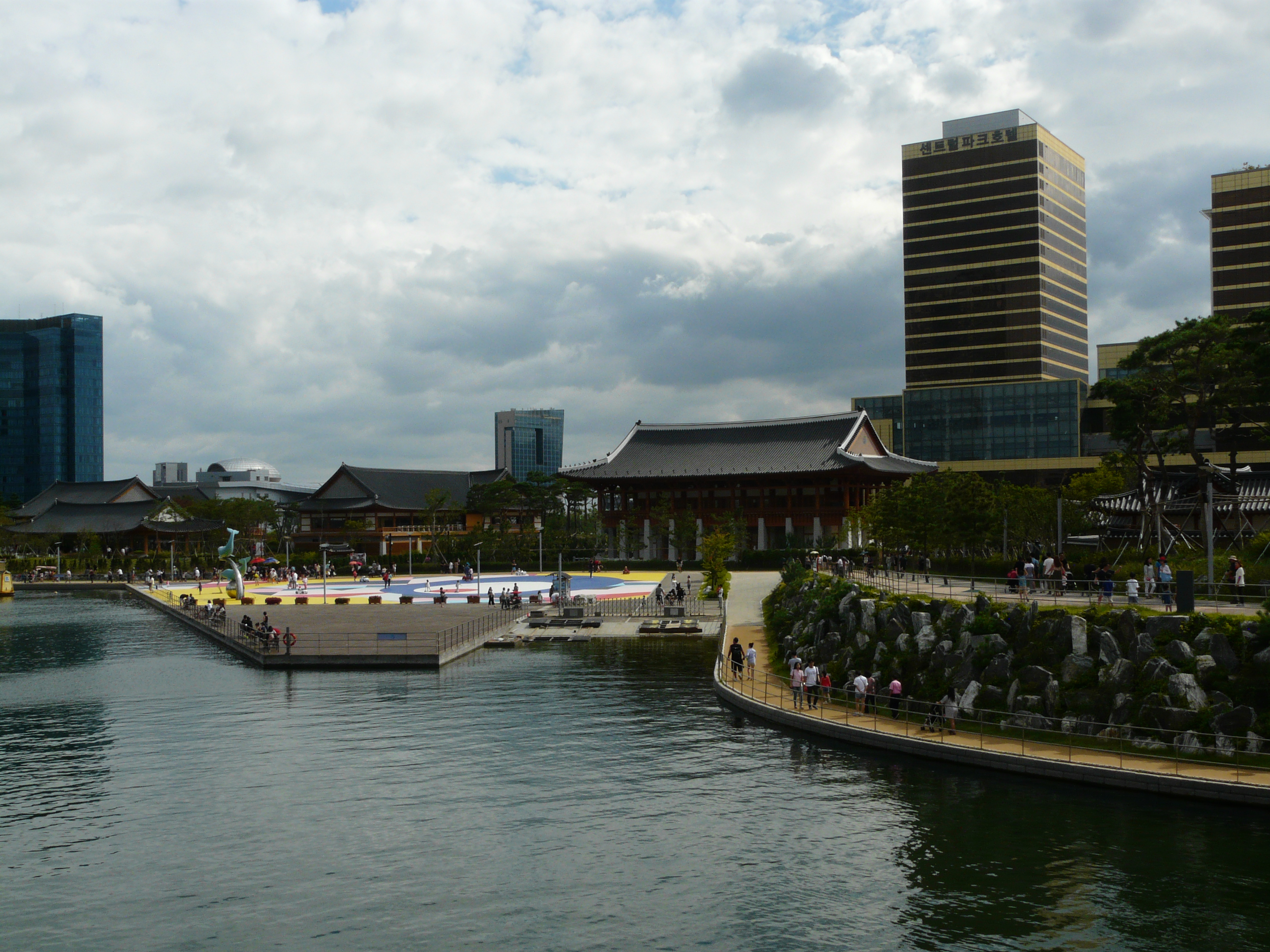

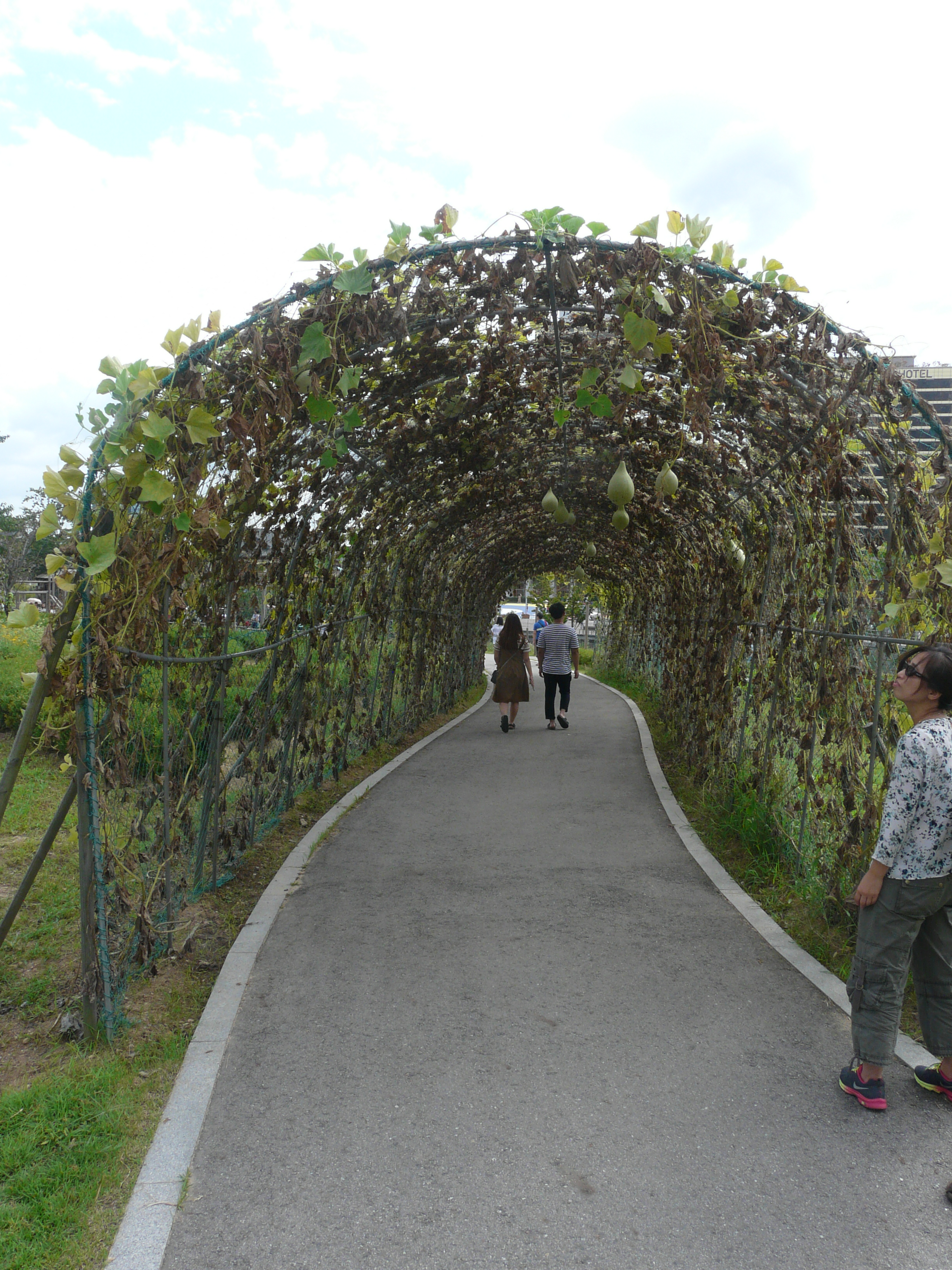

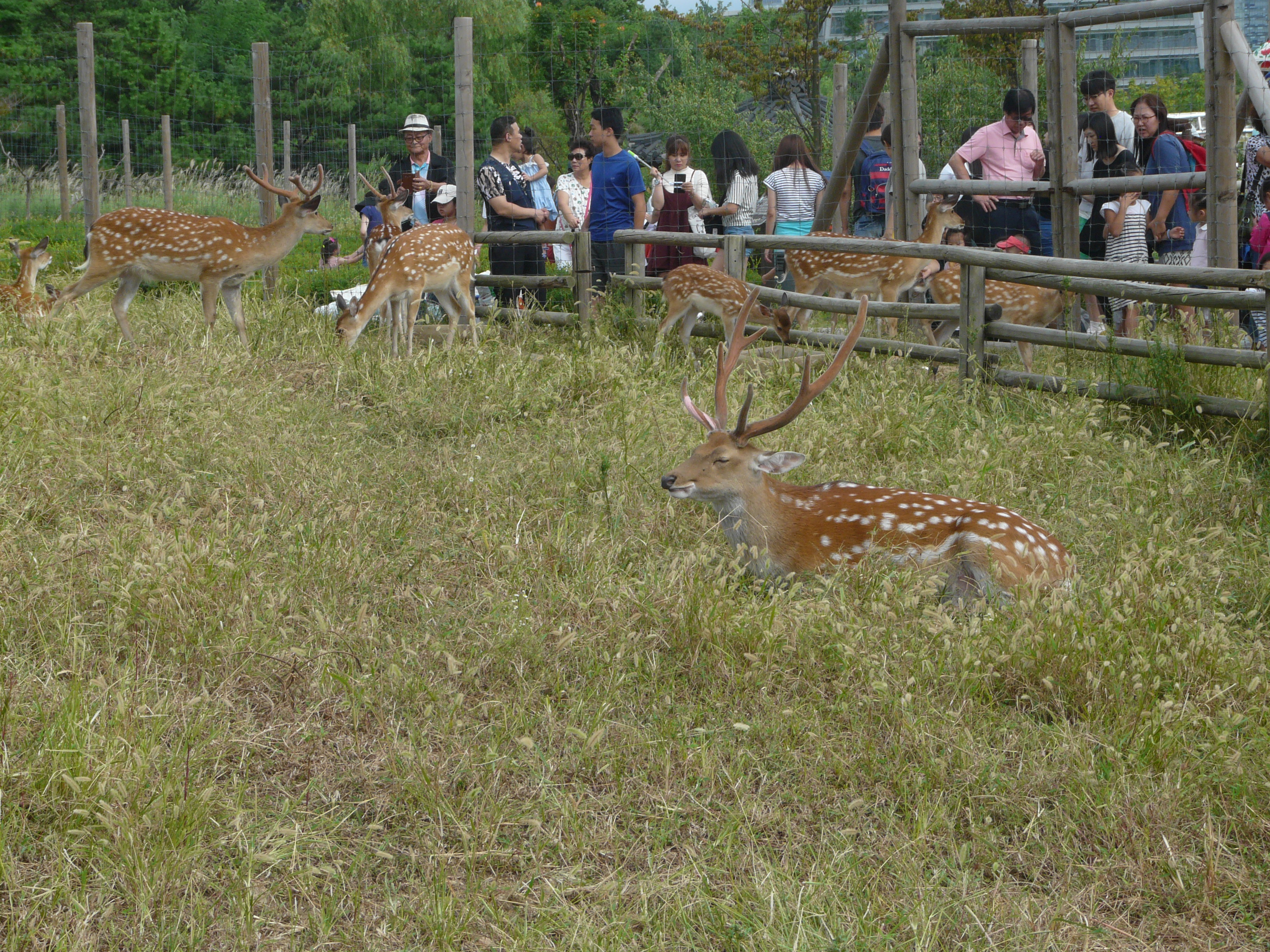

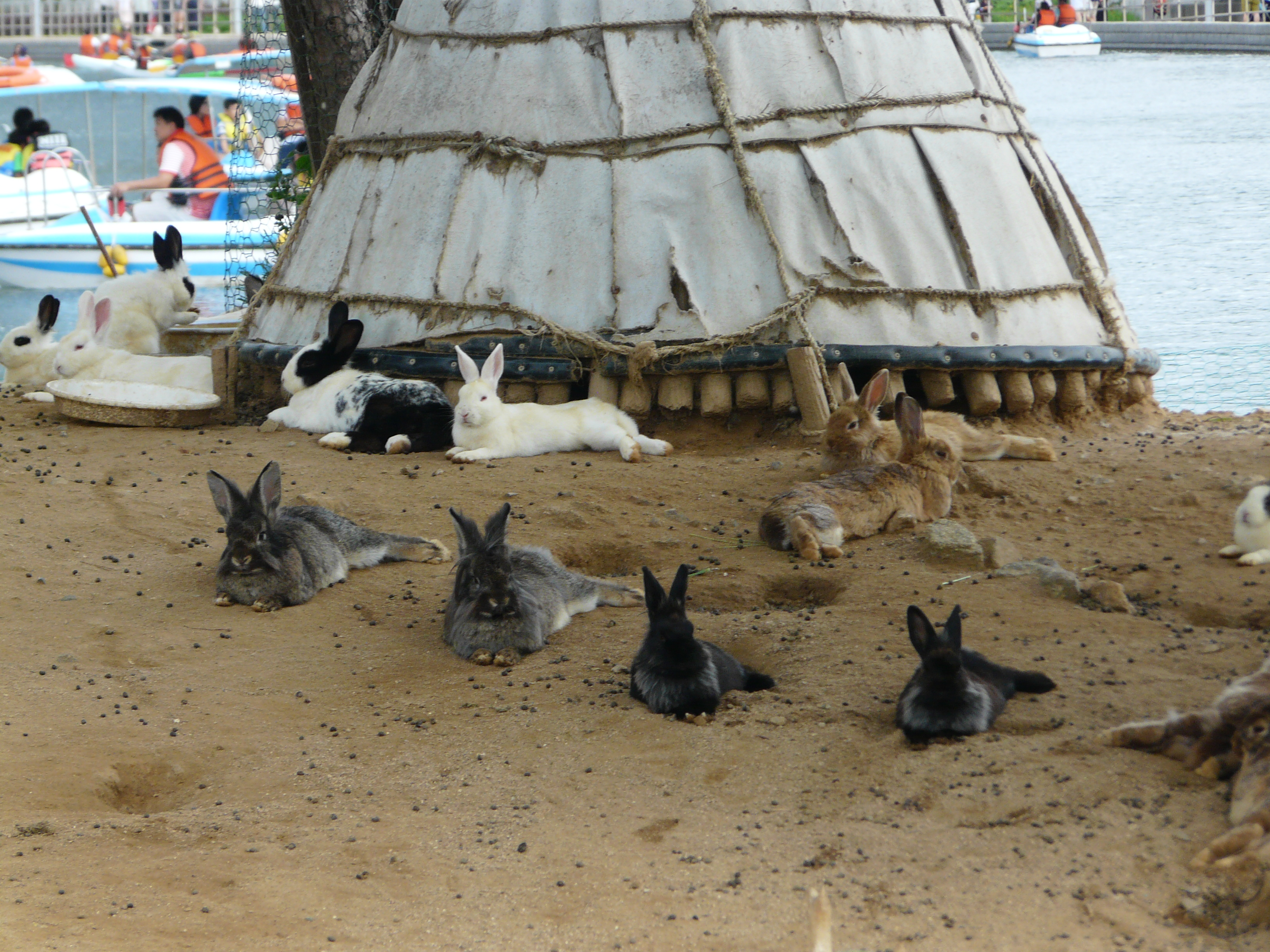

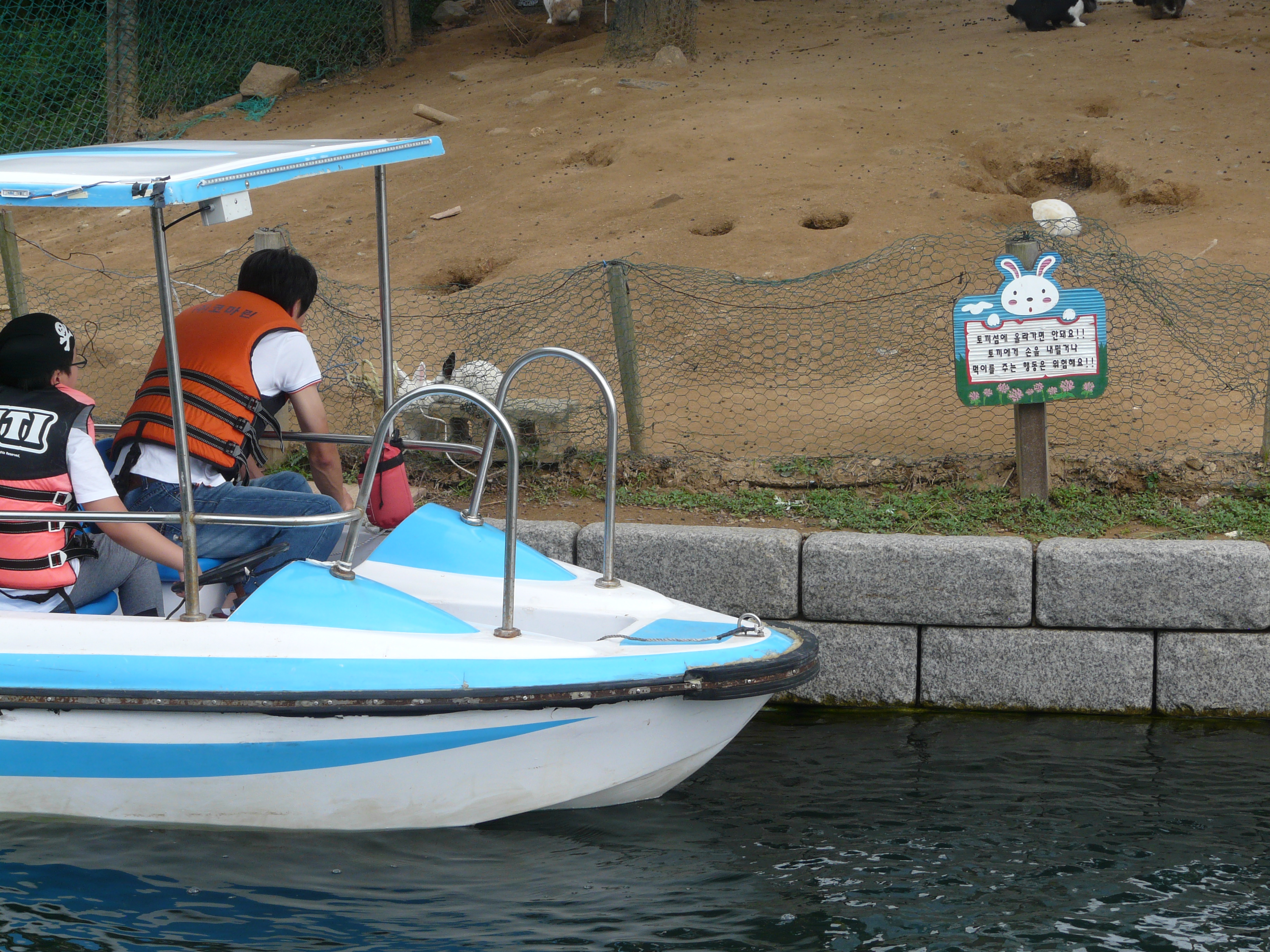

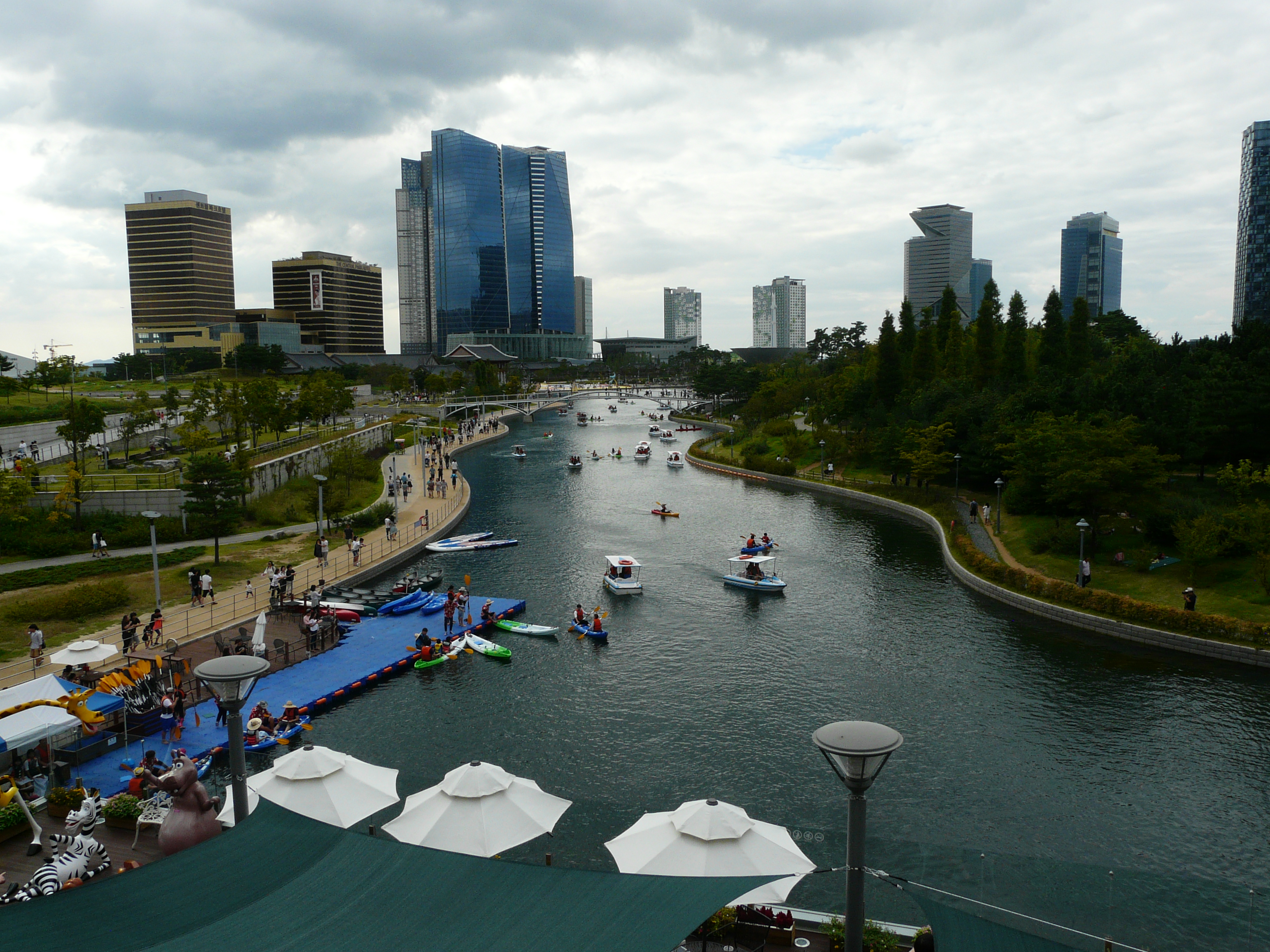

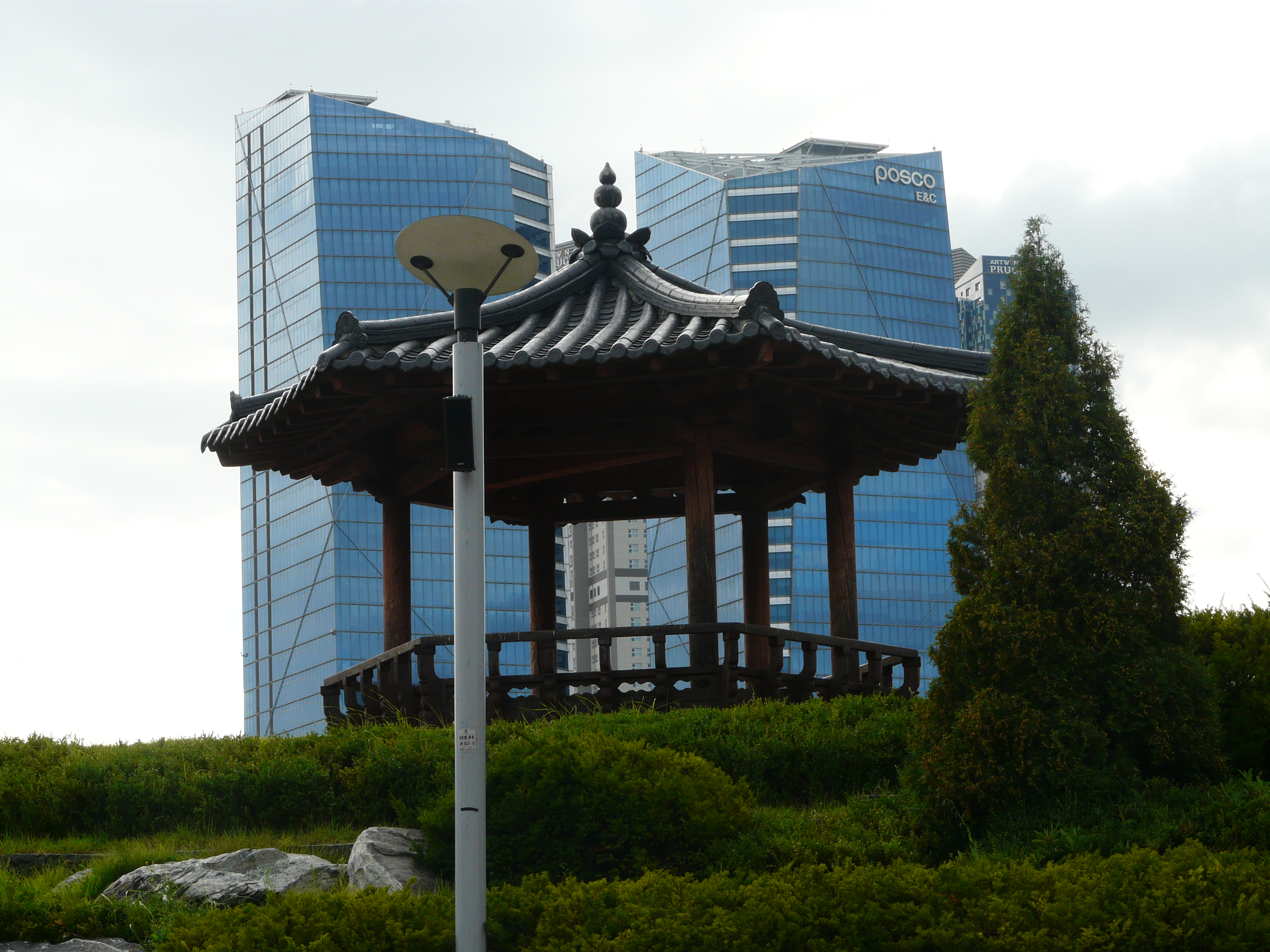

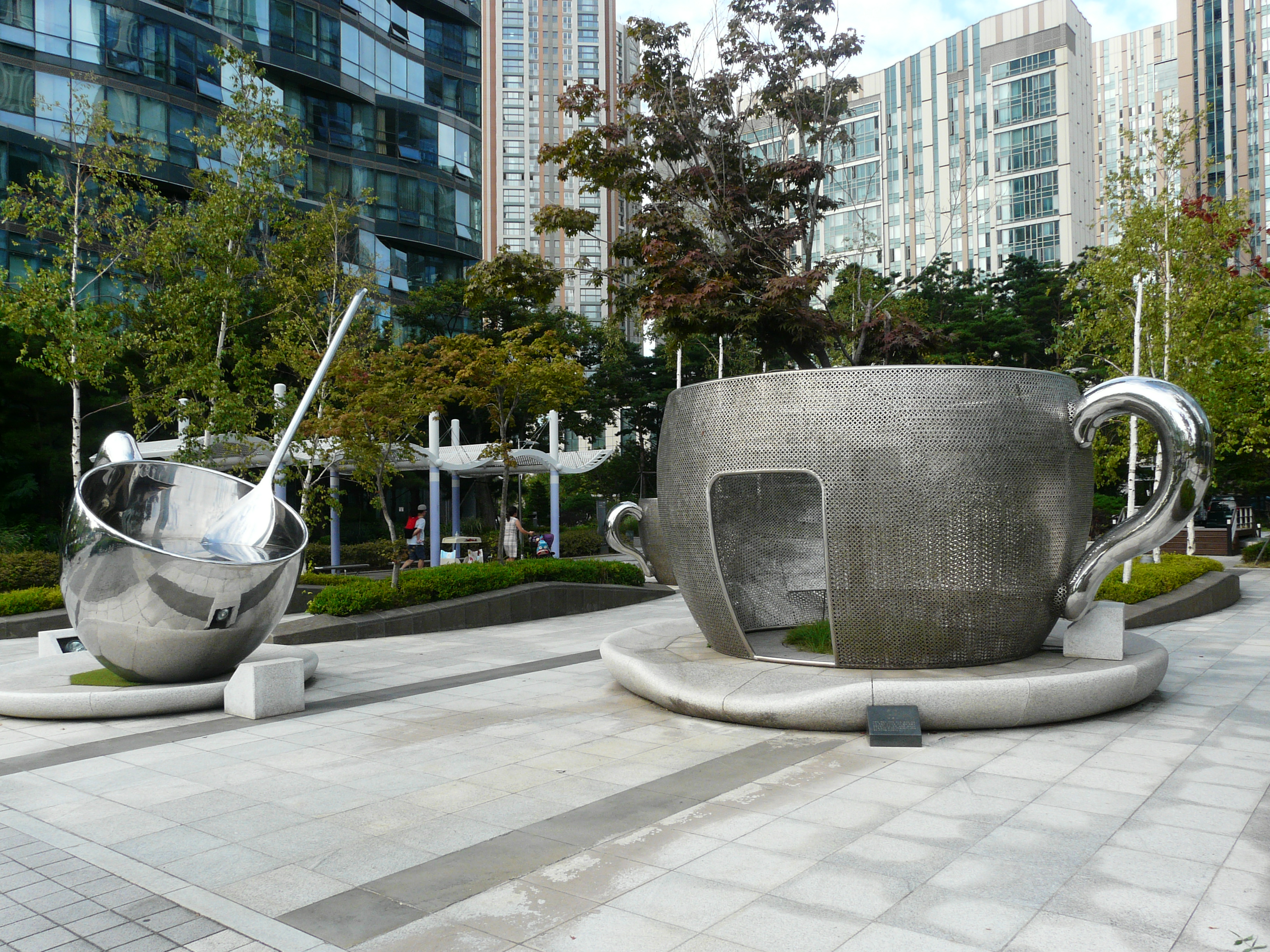

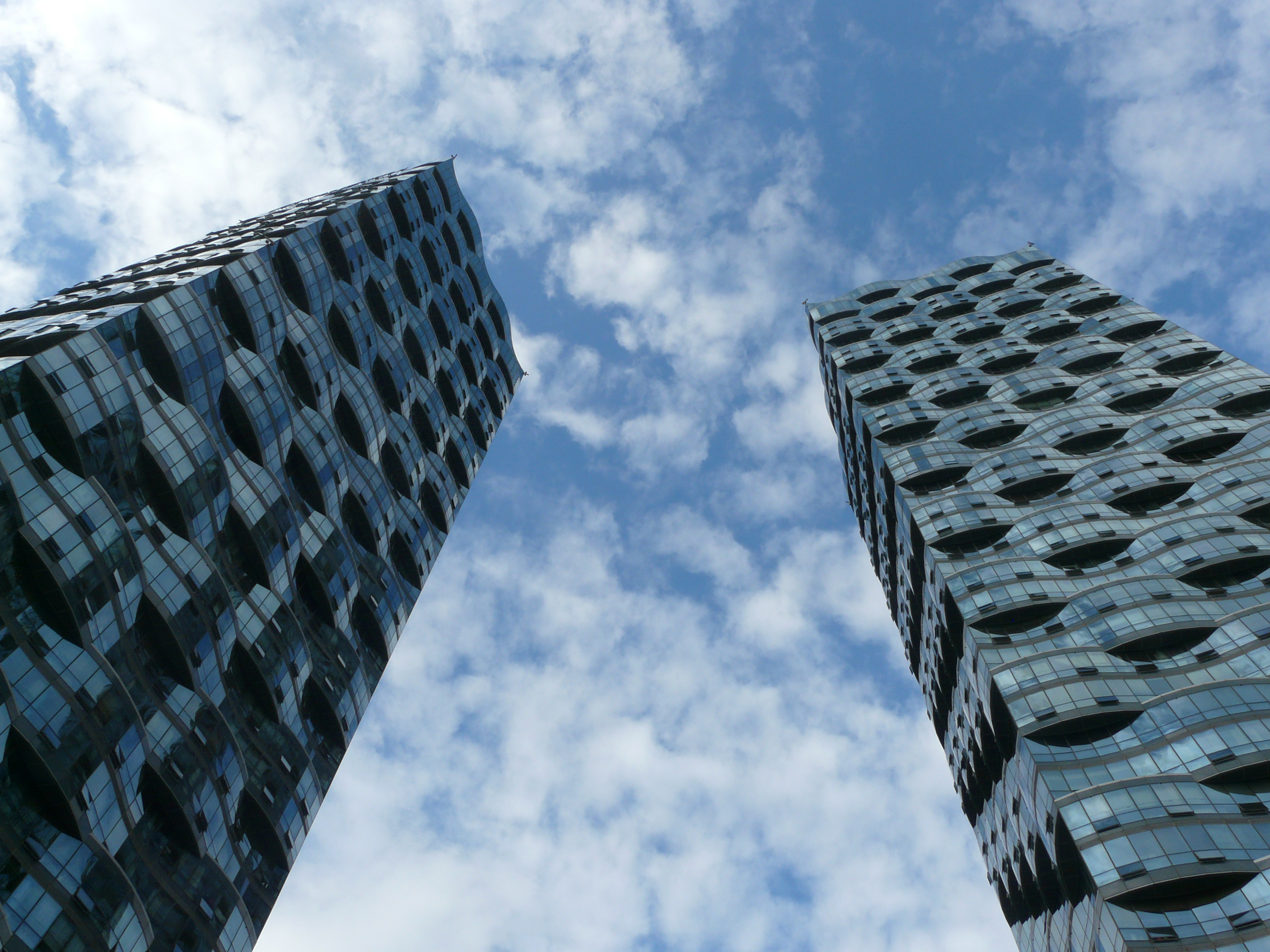

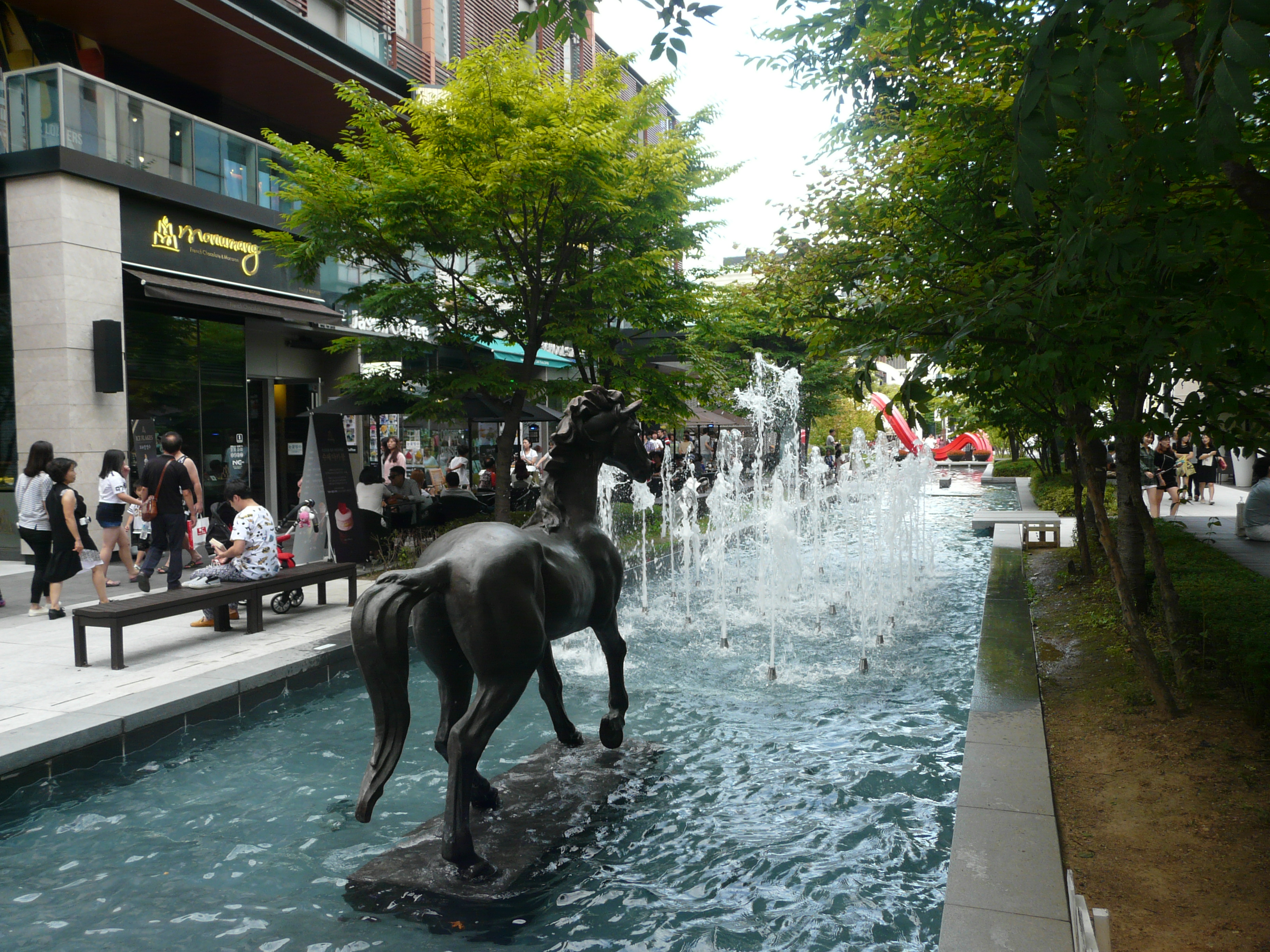

=== Songdo International City seen from Gyeonggi Province ===
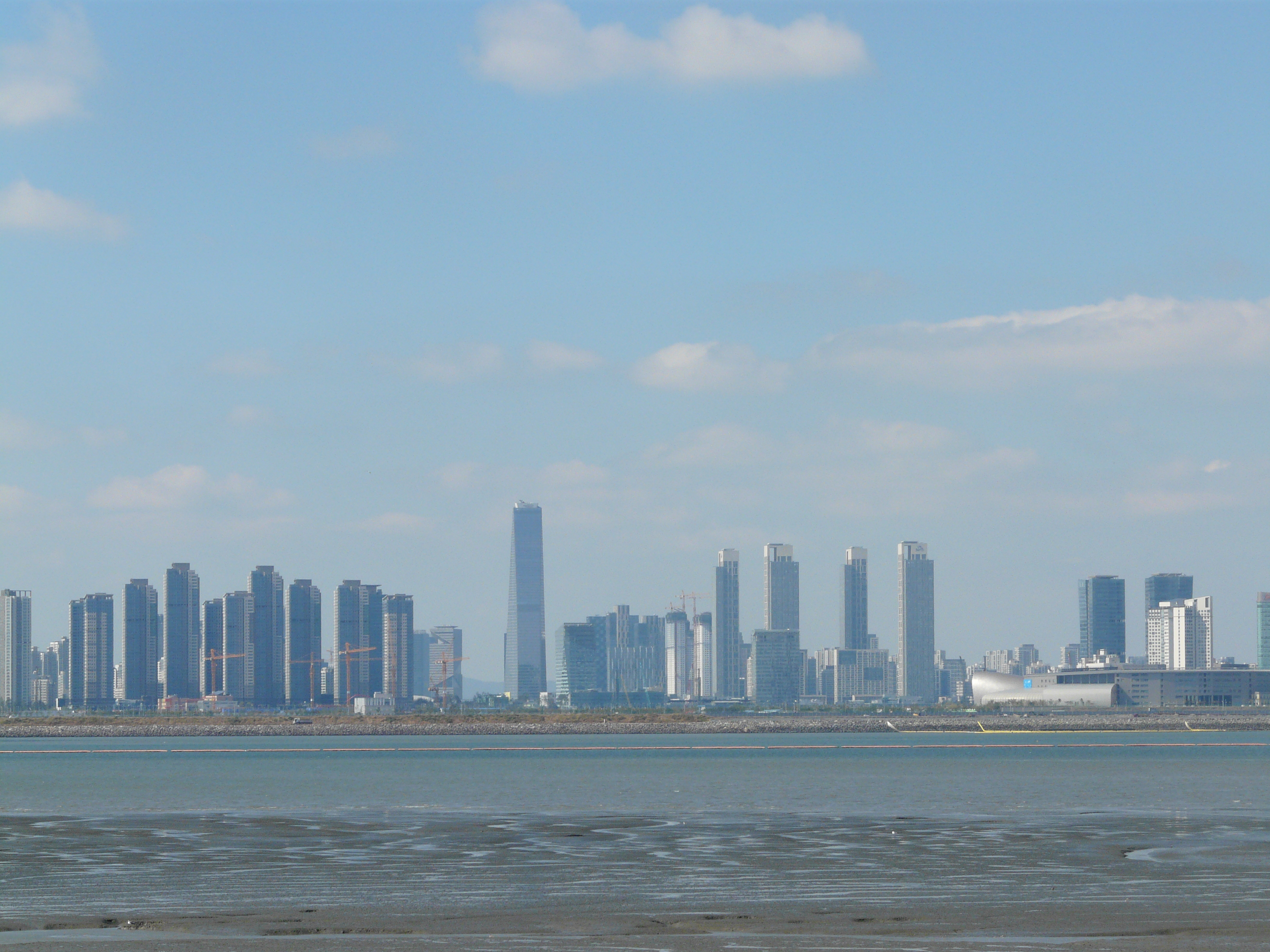

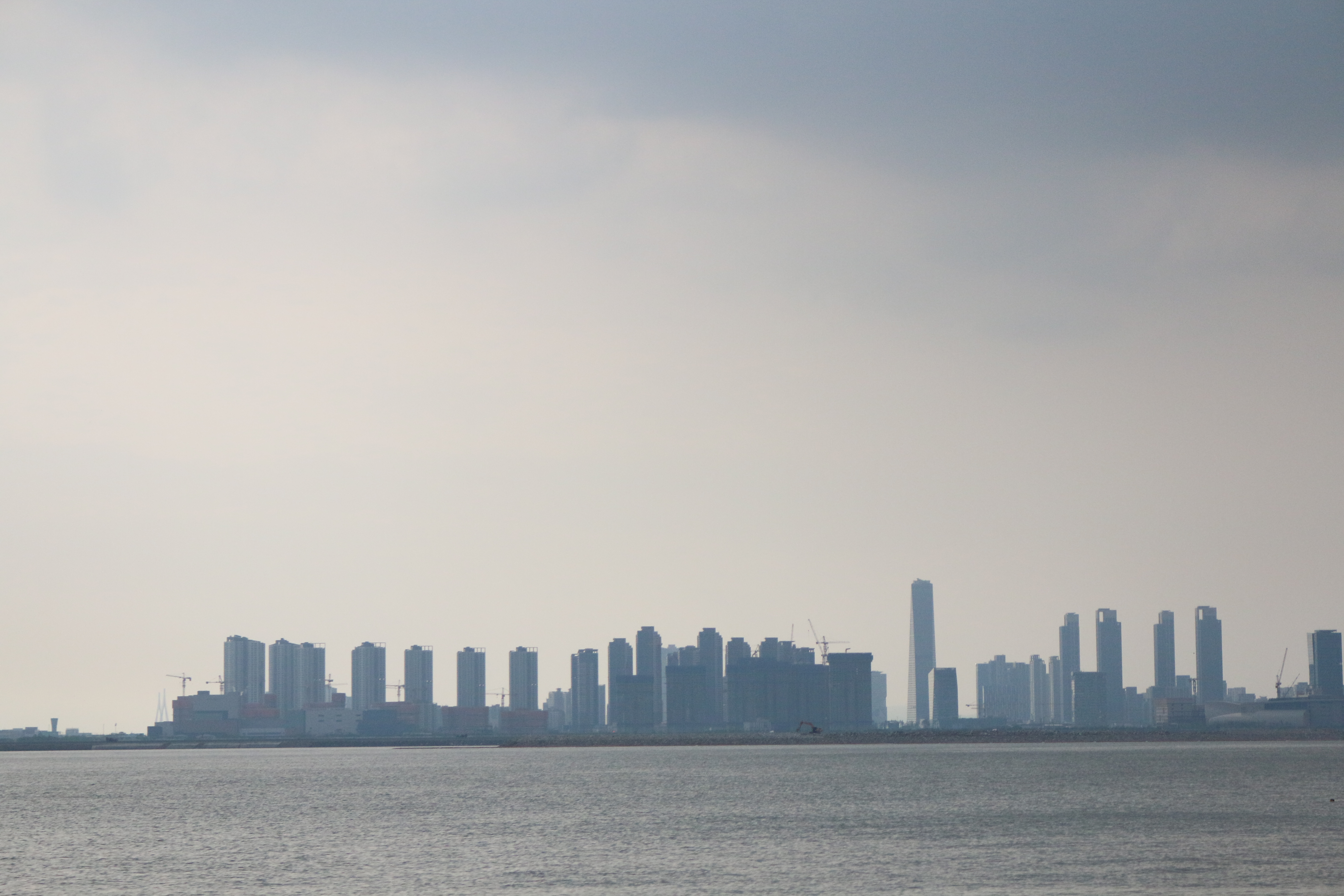

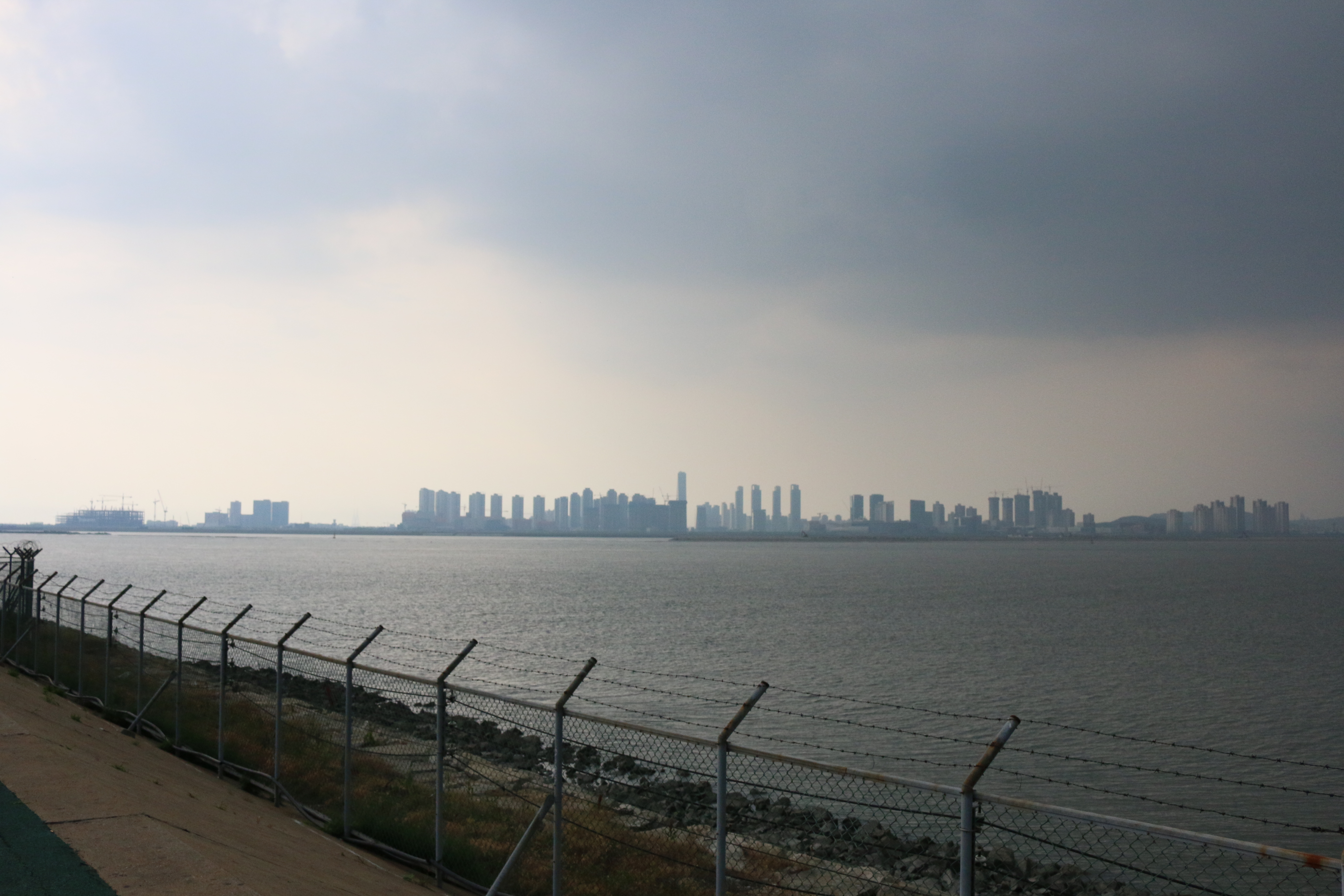
