= Chadwick International =

Coordinates: 37°23′58.6″N 126°38′38.9″E

Chadwick International School
- Songdo, Incheon; South Korea

Information
- Type: Independent; International School
- Established: 2010
- Administration: Ted Hill; Head of School Julian Taylor; Village School Principal Geoff Dumelie; Village School Assistant Principal Charlton Jackson; Middle School Principal Patrick Kearnan; Middle School Assistant Principal Megan Shaffer; Upper School Principal Anthony Jacobs; Upper School Dean of Students
- Faculty: ~150
- Enrollment: ~1300 students in 2021-22 school year
- Average class size: ~25 students
- Student to teacher ratio: 8:1
- Campus: Urban; 1.7 acres (6,900 m^{2}); 500,000 square feet (46,000 m^{2})
- Colors: Navy Blue and White
- Mascot: Dolphins
- School Song: Spirit Song / Alma Mater / Core Values Song
- Origin: Chadwick School
- Website: www.chadwickinternational.org

Chadwick International (CI; Korean: 채드윅송도국제학교 or 채드윅 국제학교) is a PK-12, coeducational, nonsectarian, non-profit, independent, international day school located in Songdo, South Korea.

The curriculum is based on the International Baccalaureate (IB) program and received PYP, MYP, DP, and CP accreditations.

It is currently run by the Roessler-Chadwick Foundation and is named after Chadwick School in Palos Verdes, California, United States. The school has three divisions, which are the Village School (PK-G5), the Middle School (G6-8), and the Upper School (G9-12).

== History ==
Chadwick International was founded in 2010 with a 150 billion won (US$135 million) investment by the Incheon Metropolitan City government as part of the $40+ billion Songdo International Business District.

== Extracurricular Activities ==
=== Athletics ===
Chadwick International is a member school of KAIAC (Korean-American Interscholastic Activities Conference) among 17 other international schools located in South Korea, and competes in a variety of sports against members of the KAIAC school league.

The school has two indoor gymnasiums equipped with a rock-climbing wall, an athletic field, a running track, five tennis courts, courtyard, football field, an indoor 25m pool along with a dance studio and a weight training room.

Chadwick International offers a variety of sports available to students, with some that allow for students to continue off season practices and participate in competitions all year.

==== Village school sports ====
- Badminton
- Basketball
- Cross country
- Flag football
- Floor hockey
- Soccer
- Swimming
- Table tennis
- Tennis
- Track and field
- Ultimate Frisbee
- Volleyball
- Cheer

==== Middle school sports ====
- Badminton
  - Boys Badminton
  - Girls Badminton
- Basketball
  - Boys Basketball
  - Girls Basketball
- Cheerleading
- Cross country
  - Boys Cross Country
  - Girls Cross Country
- Dance
- Fit team
- Golf
  - Boys Golf
  - Girls Golf
- Soccer
  - Boys Soccer
  - Girls Soccer
- Swimming
  - Boys Swimming
  - Girls Swimming
- Table tennis
- Tennis
  - Boys Tennis
  - Girls Tennis
- Robotics

==== Upper school sports ====
- Badminton
  - Boys Badminton
  - Girls Badminton
- Basketball
  - Boys Basketball
  - Girls Basketball
- Cheerleading
- Cross country
  - Boys Cross country
  - Girls Cross country
- Dance
- Fit team
- Soccer
  - Boys Soccer
  - Girls Soccer
- Swimming
  - Boys Swimming
  - Girls Swimming
- Tennis
  - Boys Tennis
  - Girls Tennis
- Track and field
  - Boys Track and field
  - Girls Track and field
- Golf
  - Boys Golf
  - Girls Golf
- Volleyball
  - Boys Volleyball
  - Girls Volleyball

=== Outdoor Education ===
Similar to its sister school, Chadwick School, Chadwick International's Outdoor Education (OE) Program allows for students from Grade 5 to Grade 12 to explore the outdoors in various locations within Korea, progressively lengthening the trip as the students rise in grade level.

During the 2020–2021 school year, due to the COVID-19 pandemic, Chadwick International hosted its Outdoor Education within Songdo International City, with activities planned around local parks and tents set up inside campus.

Year	Location(s)	Length	Notes
4th Grade	Yeongjong Island (Airport Island)	2 days	Base camp trip
5th Grade	Yeongjong Island (Airport Island)	3 days	Base camp trip
6th Grade	Yeongjong Island (Airport Island)	5days	Base camp trip
7th Grade	Hwacheon, Gangwon Province	5 days	Base camp trip
8th Grade	Bangtaesan National Natural Recreation Forest	5 days	Multiparty trip
9th Grade	Chungju Lake or Yeongnam Alps	5 days	Multiparty trip
10th Grade	Chungju Lake or Yeongnam Alps	5 days	Multiparty trip
11th Grade	Nakdong River and Cheongnyangsan	7 days	Multiparty trip
12th Grade	Han river watershed	11 days	Multiparty trip

== Future Pathways ==
While the Chadwick International College Counseling team primarily supports students through the university application process, Chadwick International Future Pathways was established to broaden career exploration opportunities beyond college admissions.

== Statistics and Figures ==
- As of 2021, the tuition fee for Chadwick International for a full year are KRW 22,950,000 + USD 13,020 for Village School (PK-G5), KRW 24,670,000 + USD 13,990 for Middle School (G6-G8), and KRW 27,000,000 + USD 15,320 (G9-G12).
- Additional fees for new students are the application fee of KRW 400,000 and matriculation fee of KRW 1,000,000.
- Admissions start from the start of November to late January. (For the 2021–2022 school year, applications were accepted from November 2, 2020, to January 18, 2021.)
