= Dohwa-dong, Seoul =

Coordinates: 37°29′N 126°39′E

Dohwa-dong
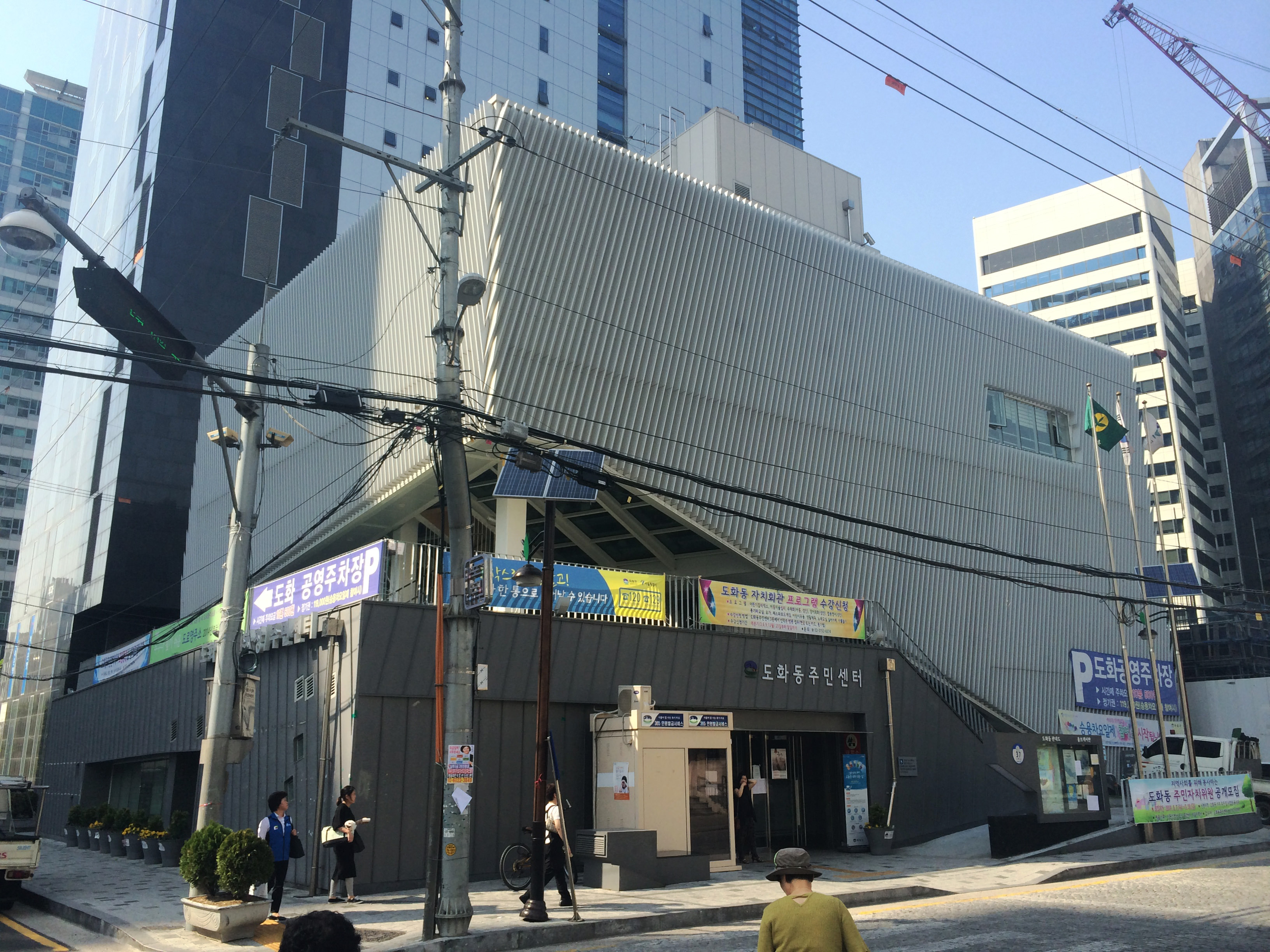
- Dohwa-dong Community Service Center
- Interactive map of Dohwa-dong
- Country: South Korea

Area
  - Total: 0.58 km^{2} (0.22 sq mi)

Population (2001)
  - Total: 23,650
  - Density: 41,000/km^{2} (110,000/sq mi)

Korean name
- Hangul: 도화동
- Hanja: 桃花洞
- RR: Dohwa-dong
- MR: Tohwa-dong

Dohwa-dong (Korean: 도화동) is a dong (neighborhood) of Mapo District, Seoul, South Korea.

== Overview ==
During the Joseon Dynasty, Dohwa-dong was part of the Mapo-gye and Dohwa-dong-gye in Yongsanbang, the western district of Hanseongbu. In 1911, it belonged to Yongsan-myeon of Gyeongseongbu, and in 1914 it was called Dohwa-jeong. In 1943, it was incorporated into Yongsan-gu, and in 1944, its jurisdiction was changed to Mapo-gu. On October 1, 1946, it was renamed Dohwa-dong.

The Mapo Apartment, completed in 1962, was introduced as the first apartment complex built in Korea. However, it turned out that this apartment served as the main residential hub of Seoul for 29 years, until 1991.

== See also ==
- Administrative divisions of South Korea
- Mapo Apartment
