= Cheongna International City =

Development project in Incheon, South Korea

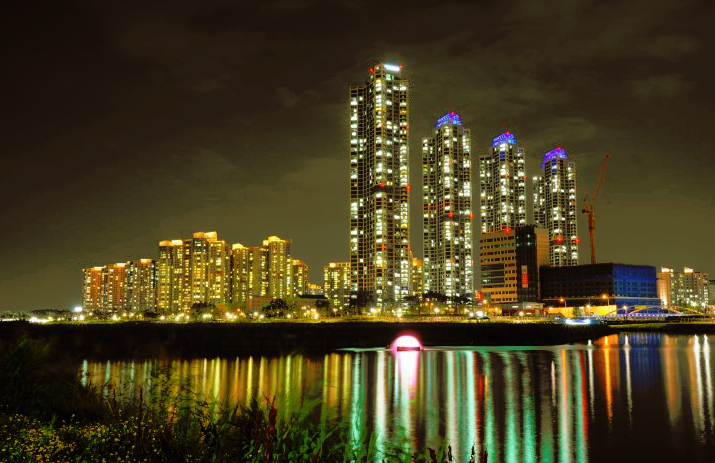
DWPPP

Cheongna International City (Korean: 청라국제도시) is a development project in Seohae District, Incheon, South Korea. The city is built on a nearly two million square foot plot of land (5.38 million Korean pyong) that expects a maximum population of 90,000. The city is located on the coast and near to Yeongjong Island and Incheon International Airport to Seoul via the Incheon International Airport Expressway, the Kyeong-in Expressway, the Incheon International Airport Railroad, and the Kyeong-in Ferry Line.

Among the city's first complexes are GM Korea's Research and Development center, the only international school in Korea to be recognized as a domestic educational institution, the Cheong-na Dalton School, and Jack Nicklaus' Bear's Best Golf club the world's third-ranking Golf course after Summerlin and Atlanta.
The city has scheduled other projects such as the 450 meter-high CC Tower, the largest domestic lake park in Korea, an international business and finance center, a high-tech industrial complex, Robot Land Theme Park, an international science and research complex, a floral park, U-ECO City and Holy Land.
Hana Financial Group is planning to transfer its headquarters here to what will be called Hana Dream Town. LG Group is planning to construct an electric vehicle research facility by the end of 2012.

== Transportation ==
=== Expressways ===
The Incheon International Airport Expressway to the north and the Kyeong-in Expressway to the east both service Cheong-na, and currently the second Seoul Ring Expressway is undergoing construction as planned. The completion of the Cheong-na bridge, the third connection between Cheong-na and Yeongjong Island, directly connects Incheon International Airport, Cheong-na, and Seoul through a single corridor.

=== Railways ===
With the completion of the north-side Cheong-na subway station on the Incheon International Airport Railroad, within just thirty minutes commuters can reach Seoul Station. Reaching Sinnonhyeon Station via Seoul Subway Line 9 is expected to take just one hour. To the east of the city, the Incheon Subway Line 2 is being constructed, and the Seoul Subway Line 7 is also planned to be extended all the way to Cheong-na. Also, a GRT Tram is planned to run circularly between Cheong-na station, Ruwon City, and Seoknam Station.

=== Ferries ===
The Kyeong-in Canal is planned to provide ferry service from Incheon Terminal (Cheong-na), to Gimpo Terminal, and ultimately Yongsan.

== See also ==
- Incheon Free Economic Zone
- Yeongjong Island
