= Gale International =

American real estate development and investment company

- Company type: Privately held company
- Industry: Real estate development and investment
- Founder: Stan Gale
- Headquarters: New York City, United States
- Key people: Stan Gale (chairman)
- Website: www.galeintl.com

Gale International is a privately owned real estate development company based in New York City. With roots dating back to 1922, the company is active in North America and Asia, specializing in city-scale, commercial, mixed-use, and golf course developments.

== History ==
In 1922 Daniel Gale founded the Daniel Gale Agency, a residential real estate development and brokerage company based in Long Island, New York. Daniel Gale’s son, Kent Gale, expanded the firm to become one of the largest privately owned real estate brokerages in the U.S., known today as Daniel Gale Sotheby’s International Realty.

Kent Gale’s son Stan Gale founded The Gale Company in 1985. By 1990, the company had amassed a $500 million portfolio of development properties. Working with partners such as JP Morgan, Morgan Stanley and SL Green, The Gale Company diversified into investment, development, property management, leasing and global facilities management, culminating in a sale to Mack-Cali Realty in 2008 for $545 million. The transaction was then one of the largest sales of a privately owned company to a public REIT (real estate investment trust).

== Projects ==
Notable U.S. projects include the relocation of the U.S. headquarters of Sanofi-Aventis Group to Bridgewater, New Jersey, in a $250 million lease transaction. One Lincoln Street, a landmark 1.1M SF speculative office tower in Boston’s Financial District, was 100% leased to State Street Financial while under construction and subsequently sold in 2004 for $705 million, which was, at the time, the most valuable commercial real estate transaction in Boston's history.

The Gale Company’s first golf course-centric master planned community was the Ibis Golf and Country Club in West Palm Beach, comprising 2,500 homes and three Nicklaus golf courses, completed in 1996. One of the company’s noteworthy mixed-use projects is the Green at Florham Park (New Jersey), a 270-acre joint venture with The Rockefeller Group that includes a new headquarters and training facility for the New York Jets professional football team, age-restricted housing, a luxury hotel and an office complex.

Recent projects include the 21W20 residential condominium in New York City’s Flatiron District, and the Campus at Greenhill, a 300,000 SF Class A office complex located on 104 acres, in Wallingford, CT.

In February 2022, Daniel Gale Sotheby's International Realty celebrated its centennial with a celebration at the UBS Arena in New York.

=== Songdo International Business District (South Korea) ===
Gale International has served as a principal developer of Songdo IBD, a 1,500-acre master-planned district in the Incheon Free Economic Zone built on reclaimed land on the coast of Incheon, South Korea.

In June 2017, the U.S. Green Building Council (USGBC) announced Songdo IBD as the first project to earn LEED for Communities precertification under its LEED Cities and Communities framework.

=== Meixi Lake District (China) ===
Gale International has signed an agreement with the Changsha municipal government to develop the Meixi Lake District (also known as Meixi Lake ecocity), a planned district projected to house up to 180,000 residents on roughly 1,675 acres.

=== 21W20 (New York City) ===
In 2017, the International WELL Building Institute (IWBI) reported that 21W20, a residential project in Manhattan developed by Gale International, became the first multifamily residential project certified under the WELL Building Standard.

=== Selected earlier U.S. developments (The Gale Company) ===
Before the Mack-Cali acquisition, The Gale Company participated in various U.S. commercial real estate transactions, including:

- A long-term lease for Sanofi-aventis' U.S. headquarters relocation to a Bridgewater, New Jersey campus.
- The 2004 sale of the One Lincoln Street office tower (State Street Financial Center) in Boston, a $705 million transaction shortly after completion.

== Sustainability and Wellness ==
To achieve the mandate for Songdo set forth by the South Korean government, which called for a state-of-the-art urban development built to international standards, Gale applied the U.S. Green Building Council’s LEED certification system to the Songdo IBD project. Songdo IBD boasts over 20 million sq ft of LEED-certified space, including the nation’s first LEED-certified residential building (Central Park residential), LEED-certified school (Chadwick International), LEED-certified hotel (Sheraton Incheon), and Asia’s first LEED-certified convention center (Convensia).

The company’s 21W 20th St residential project earned the world’s first ever WELL certification under the WELL building standard, a system that measures the residential environment’s impact on residents’ health and wellness.
