= Incheon Free Economic Zone =

Free Economic Zone in South Korea

The Incheon Free Economic Zone (IFEZ; Korean: 인천경제자유구역), located in Incheon, South Korea is a Korean Free Economic Zone that consists of the three regions of Songdo, Cheongna, and the island of Yeongjong and has a total area of 51,739 acres (209.38 km^{2}). The goal of the IFEZ is to transform these three areas into hubs for logistics, international business, leisure, and tourism for the Northeast Asian region. Incheon's Free Economic Zone was officially designated by the Korean government in August 2003. The IFEZ is planned to be a self-contained living and business district featuring air and sea transportation, a logistics complex, an international business center, financial services, residences, schools and hospitals, and shopping and entertainment centers.

In February 2024, Dr. Yun Won Sok was named the new Commissioner of the Incheon Free Economic Zone (IFEZ), responsible for developing the zone and attracting foreign investments in high-tech industries and tourism.

== Purpose ==
The Incheon Free Economic Zone (IFEZ) was established with the intent of opening South Korea to Foreign Direct Investment (FDI) and becoming one of the top economic zones in the world. The time period for the Infrastructure Development stage was from 2003 to 2009, and the time period for the Project Development stage was from 2010 to 2014. The first stage is for building infrastructure, and the second stage is for "expanding the infrastructure for education, health, and leisure, and attracting domestic and international businesses". The final stage is ongoing and to realize the goal of the project of building a top three economic zone in the world.

== Songdo International City ==
The Songdo district development began in 1994 and was built on reclaimed land. It is a smart city and a hub for international trade.

Today, Songdo is a community of 167,000 residents located within one of three Free Economic Zones (IFEZ) in Incheon, South Korea. The project has been approximately 86% completed. Aside from residential areas, the location is also home to a Global Campus, Pharma Hub, Startup Center, and international organizations such as the Green Climate Fund.

== Yeongjong Island ==
Yeongjong International City's 34,183 acres (138.33 km^{2}) centering on the Incheon International Airport has been developed as an eco-friendly airport city and aerotropolis. It is a functional city with residential amenities for airport staff and visitors, as well as logistics, commercial and distribution facilities. Yeongjong provides an optimal environment for logistic, tourism and leisure in conjunction with the Incheon International Airport.

== Cheongna ==
The Cheongna district, on the mainland adjacent Yeongjong Island. Plans call for Cheongna, as part of the IFEZ to become a business area specially designed for international finance, entertainment, tourism, and gaming.
