= Triathlon at the 2018 Asian Games – Mixed relay =

Mixed relay at the 2018 Asian Games
- Venue: Jakabaring Sport City
- Date: 2 September 2018
- Competitors: 52 from 13 nations

Medalists
| gold medal | Japan; Yuka Sato, Jumpei Furuya, Yuko Takahashi, Yuichi Hosoda |
| silver medal | South Korea; Jang Yun-jung, Kim Ji-hwan, Park Ye-jin, Heo Min-ho |
| bronze medal | Hong Kong; Bailee Brown, Law Leong Tim, Hilda Choi, Wong Tsz To |

The mixed relay triathlon was part of the Triathlon at the 2018 Asian Games program, was held in JSC Lake Jakabaring on 31 August 2018. The race was held in four legs each one consisted of 300 metres (0.19 mi) swimming, 6.3 kilometres (3.9 mi) road bicycle racing, and 2.1 kilometres (1.3 mi) road running.

Japanese team managed to claim the gold medal in this event after clocked a total time of 1:30:39. South Korea and Hong Kong finished in the second and third position won the silver and bronze medal respectively.

== Schedule ==
All times are Western Indonesia Time (UTC+07:00)

| Date | Time | Event |
|---|---|---|
| Sunday, 2 September 2018 | 07:30 | Final |

== Results ==
| Rank | Team | Swim 300 m | Trans. 1 | Bike 6.3 km | Trans. 2 | Run 2.1 km | Total time |
|---|---|---|---|---|---|---|---|
| 1st place, gold medalist(s) | Japan (JPN) | | | | | | 1:30:39 |
| | Yuka Sato | 4:14 | 0:44 | 10:57 | 0:36 | 6:55 | 23:26 |
| | Jumpei Furuya | 4:07 | 0:40 | 9:40 | 0:37 | 6:29 | 21:33 |
| | Yuko Takahashi | 4:28 | 0:46 | 10:30 | 0:42 | 7:10 | 23:36 |
| | Yuichi Hosoda | 4:19 | 0:38 | 9:52 | 0:33 | 6:42 | 22:04 |
| 2nd place, silver medalist(s) | South Korea (KOR) | | | | | | 1:32:51 |
| | Jang Yun-jung | 4:18 | 0:43 | 10:56 | 0:36 | 7:04 | 23:37 |
| | Kim Ji-hwan | 4:02 | 0:38 | 10:14 | 0:34 | 6:39 | 22:07 |
| | Park Ye-jin | 4:45 | 0:41 | 11:43 | 0:37 | 7:10 | 24:56 |
| | Heo Min-ho | 4:22 | 0:39 | 10:50 | 0:33 | 5:47 | 22:11 |
| 3rd place, bronze medalist(s) | Hong Kong (HKG) | | | | | | 1:33:04 |
| | Bailee Brown | 4:20 | 0:42 | 10:52 | 0:38 | 7:29 | 24:01 |
| | Law Leong Tim | 4:21 | 0:40 | 10:01 | 0:35 | 6:34 | 22:11 |
| | Hilda Choi | 4:51 | 0:41 | 11:08 | 0:35 | 7:13 | 24:28 |
| | Wong Tsz To | 4:22 | 0:40 | 10:50 | 0:32 | 6:00 | 22:24 |
| 4 | China (CHN) | | | | | | 1:33:23 |
| | Zhong Mengying | 4:16 | 0:44 | 10:58 | 0:38 | 7:05 | 23:41 |
| | Li Mingxu | 4:09 | 0:41 | 10:28 | 0:35 | 6:32 | 22:25 |
| | Zhang Yi | 4:42 | 0:45 | 11:20 | 0:37 | 7:11 | 24:35 |
| | Liu Chen | 4:21 | 0:39 | 10:49 | 0:37 | 6:16 | 22:42 |
| 5 | Chinese Taipei (TPE) | | | | | | 1:33:44 |
| | Kuo Jia-chi | 4:24 | 0:41 | 10:50 | 0:37 | 7:28 | 24:00 |
| | Lin Wei-chih | 4:22 | 0:40 | 10:00 | 0:34 | 6:37 | 22:13 |
| | Chang Chia-chia | 4:51 | 0:46 | 11:04 | 0:40 | 8:01 | 25:22 |
| | Chang Tuan-chun | 4:29 | 0:43 | 10:01 | 0:42 | 6:14 | 22:09 |
| 6 | Philippines (PHI) | | | | | | 1:39:08 |
| | Maria Claire Adorna | 4:18 | 0:47 | 10:52 | 0:39 | 8:13 | 24:49 |
| | John Chicano | 4:50 | 0:43 | 10:34 | 0:39 | 7:02 | 23:48 |
| | Kim Mangrobang | 5:03 | 0:51 | 11:46 | 0:38 | 7:27 | 25:45 |
| | Mark Anthony Hosana | 4:48 | 0:46 | 11:12 | 0:38 | 7:22 | 24:46 |
| 7 | Uzbekistan (UZB) | | | | | | 1:41:40 |
| | Ekaterina Ryazanova | 4:40 | 0:46 | 11:55 | 0:48 | 8:52 | 27:01 |
| | Javohir Yusunov | 4:33 | 0:48 | 10:59 | 0:37 | 7:18 | 24:15 |
| | Alina Khakimova | 5:34 | 0:46 | 11:39 | 0:44 | 8:12 | 26:55 |
| | Aleksandr Kurishov | 4:13 | 0:43 | 11:11 | 0:36 | 6:46 | 23:29 |
| 8 | Macau (MAC) | | | | | | 1:43:15 |
| | Hoi Long | 4:39 | 0:45 | 10:34 | 0:39 | 7:29 | 24:06 |
| | Chao Man Kit | 4:26 | 0:44 | 10:58 | 0:41 | 7:45 | 24:34 |
| | Lei Cho Ieng | 6:07 | 0:53 | 12:35 | 0:54 | 9:53 | 30:22 |
| | Rogério Carreira | 5:10 | 0:45 | 10:31 | 0:43 | 7:04 | 24:13 |
| 9 | Indonesia (INA) | | | | | | 1:44:01 |
| | Asihta Aulia Azzahra | 4:58 | 0:52 | 11:27 | 0:57 | 9:48 | 28:02 |
| | Jauhari Johan | 5:02 | 0:41 | 10:27 | 0:42 | 6:40 | 23:32 |
| | Eva Desiana | 7:02 | 0:46 | 12:01 | 0:38 | 8:20 | 28:47 |
| | Andi Gumilang Lawello Fachri | 4:32 | 0:43 | 10:41 | 0:37 | 7:07 | 23:40 |
| 10 | Malaysia (MAS) | | | | | | 1:46:59 |
| | Irene Chong | 4:37 | 0:48 | 11:29 | 0:44 | 9:16 | 26:54 |
| | Ryan Tan | 4:50 | 0:46 | 11:39 | 0:40 | 7:31 | 25:26 |
| | Teoh Sue Ling | 6:05 | 1:03 | 12:51 | 0:56 | 9:04 | 29:59 |
| | Aldrian Yeo | 4:57 | 0:45 | 11:11 | 0:41 | 7:06 | 24:40 |
| 11 | Thailand (THA) | | | | | | 1:50:22 |
| | Thipsuda Kammee | 4:24 | 0:50 | 12:10 | 0:41 | 11:37 | 29:42 |
| | Suphakit Sukatiphum | 5:06 | 0:45 | 11:11 | 0:39 | 7:58 | 25:39 |
| | Pareeya Sonsem | 6:43 | 0:52 | 12:12 | 0:45 | 8:50 | 29:22 |
| | Kritsanaphon Phonphai | 4:25 | 0:44 | 11:17 | 0:38 | 8:35 | 25:39 |
| 12 | Nepal (NEP) | | | | | | 1:52:55 |
| | Roja K. C. | 6:15 | 0:54 | 13:23 | 0:41 | 9:09 | 30:22 |
| | Dipesh Chaudhary | 5:08 | 1:06 | 11:30 | 0:34 | 7:28 | 25:46 |
| | Sony Gurung | 6:15 | 1:02 | 13:11 | 0:43 | 10:23 | 31:34 |
| | Basanta Tharu | 5:52 | 0:46 | 11:31 | 0:29 | 6:35 | 25:13 |
| 13 | Mongolia (MGL) | | | | | | 1:59:51 |
| | Bat-Orshikhyn Enkhjin | 5:11 | 1:03 | 13:32 | 0:50 | 9:49 | 30:25 |
| | Chuluunsükhiin Gansükh | 5:39 | 0:45 | 12:25 | 0:52 | 9:54 | 29:35 |
| | Erdenebatyn Uyanga | 6:15 | 1:09 | 13:39 | 0:47 | 9:42 | 31:32 |
| | Mönkhboldyn Turbold | 5:18 | 0:58 | 11:49 | 0:41 | 9:33 | 28:19 |
