= Triathlon at the 2026 Asian Games – Mixed relay =

Mixed relay at the 2026 Asian Games
- Venue: Gamagōri City Triathlon Venue
- Date: 21 September 2026
- Competitors: 56 from 14 nations

Medalists
gold medal	China; Lin Xinyu, Li Mingxu, Huang Anqi, Zhang Xirui
silver medal	Japan; Mako Hiraizumi, Kazushi Jozuka, Manami Hayashi, Takumi Hojo
bronze medal	Hong Kong; Cade Wright, Oscar Coggins, Bailee Brown, Robin Elg

The mixed relay triathlon was part of the Triathlon at the 2026 Asian Games program, was held in Gamagōri City Triathlon Venue on 21 September 2026. The race was consisted of 300 metres (0.19 mi) swimming, 6.6 kilometres (4.1 mi) road bicycle racing, and 1 kilometre (0.62 mi) road running.

== Schedule ==
All times are Japan Standard Time (UTC+09:00)

Date	Time	Event
Monday, 21 September 2023	09:30	Final

== Results ==
Rank	Team	Swim 300 m	Trans. 1	Bike 6.6 km	Trans. 2	Run 1 km	Total time
1st place, gold medalist(s)	China						1:25:54
	Lin Xinyu	4:04	0:44	10:11	0:24	6:39	22:02
	Li Mingxu	4:03	0:46	9:48	0:21	6:10	21:08
	Huang Anqi	4:31	0:50	10:28	0:22	6:13	22:24
	Zhang Xirui	3:49	0:42	9:28	0:20	6:01	20:20
2nd place, silver medalist(s)	Japan						1:26:45
	Mako Hiraizumi	4:24	0:46	10:20	0:21	6:59	22:50
	Kazushi Jozuka	4:00	0:40	9:28	0:18	6:07	20:33
	Manami Hayashi	4:17	0:46	10:32	0:22	6:45	22:42
	Takumi Hojo	3:53	0:44	9:42	0:19	6:02	20:40
3rd place, bronze medalist(s)	Hong Kong						1:27:25
	Cade Wright	4:14	0:47	10:30	0:25	7:22	23:18
	Oscar Coggins	3:57	0:44	9:18	0:23	5:52	20:14
	Bailee Brown	4:24	0:50	10:47	0:23	6:54	23:18
	Robin Elg	4:03	0:40	9:26	0:21	6:05	20:35
4	South Korea						1:28:27
	Kim Hye-rang	4:15	0:51	10:25	0:23	6:57	22:51
	Kim Tae-gi	3:59	0:43	9:25	0:18	6:33	20:58
	Jeong Hye-rim	4:22	0:45	10:37	0:22	6:55	23:01
	Park Sang-min	4:01	0:41	10:09	0:21	6:25	21:37
5	Indonesia						1:31:00
	Martina Ayu Pratiwi	4:25	0:46	10:20	0:22	6:48	22:41
	Hauqalah Fakhal Arvyello	4:07	0:45	10:01	0:21	6:57	22:11
	Kayla Nadia Shafa	4:46	0:51	11:26	0:23	7:19	24:45
	Rashif Amila Yaqin	4:09	0:46	10:03	0:24	6:01	21:23
6	Chinese Taipei						1:31:17
	Chang Chi-wen	4:27	0:43	10:20	0:22	7:34	23:26
	Pan Tzu-i	3:52	0:41	9:19	0:18	6:28	20:38
	Pan Yu-ting	4:52	0:49	11:08	0:31	7:30	24:50
	Chiang Tien-yu	4:15	0:48	10:15	0:20	6:45	22:23
7	Kazakhstan						1:31:45
	Diana Yerzhanova	4:21	0:43	10:28	0:27	7:53	23:52
	Yegor Krupyakov	3:58	0:41	9:59	0:24	6:36	21:38
	Aida Kim	4:47	0:51	11:23	0:28	7:40	25:09
	Ayan Beisenbayev	4:06	0:44	9:55	0:22	5:59	21:06
8	Uzbekistan						1:32:31
	Alina Khakimova	4:29	0:59	11:10	0:24	7:06	24:08
	Aleksandr Kurishov	3:55	0:43	10:26	0:22	6:31	21:57
	Diana Biktimirova	4:37	0:50	11:28	0:27	7:58	25:20
	Jeremy Quindos	4:05	0:44	9:31	0:21	6:25	21:06
9	Philippines						1:32:56
	Raven Alcoseba	4:14	0:48	10:29	0:25	7:34	23:30
	Kim Remolino	4:13	0:48	10:25	0:22	6:48	22:36
	Kim Mangrobang	4:47	0:53	11:48	0:24	7:32	25:24
	Fernando Casares	4:20	0:45	9:49	0:23	6:09	21:26
10	Singapore						1:33:20
	Kathlyn Yeo	4:27	0:49	11:10	0:24	7:49	24:39
	Luke Chua	4:16	0:45	10:10	0:20	6:27	21:58
	Wan Ting Lim	4:32	0:49	11:33	0:26	7:45	25:05
	Yi Jun Tey	4:05	0:43	10:10	0:19	6:21	21:38
11	Macau						1:37:27
	Hoi Long	4:22	0:46	10:28	0:26	7:51	23:53
	Lao Cheok Hei	4:35	0:49	10:45	0:23	7:21	23:53
	Cheng Wan U	5:01	0:54	11:45	0:26	7:58	26:04
	Chan Chon Ip	4:47	0:46	10:51	0:27	6:46	23:37
12	Thailand						1:41:33
	Pichayanat Kittivorakij	4:22	0:55	12:19	0:27	8:28	26:31
	Phuwadet Rakmanusa	4:26	0:56	10:41	0:23	7:39	24:05
	Kankamol Sangkaew	6:00	0:51	11:34	0:25	8:43	27:33
	Kritsanaphon Phonphai	4:21	0:48	11:02	0:24	6:49	23:24
13	Kyrgyzstan						1:43:05
	Angelina Blindul	4:54	0:53	11:46	0:29	8:09	26:11
	Temirlan Abdrakhimov	4:23	0:46	11:00	0:22	7:45	24:16
	Anna Kramarenko	5:26	1:02	12:57	0:28	8:16	28:09
	Adamkhan Arturovich Salamatov	4:43	0:49	11:16	0:25	7:16	24:29
—	Pakistan						DNF
	Anisha	8:38	1:49	14:56	0:25	12:35	38:23
	Muhammad Mustaghis Noor	6:53	1:16	13:30	0:23	10:22	32:24
	Sana Arif	8:18	1:29	14:41	0:27	12:45	37:40
	Ali Hassan	8:25					DNF
