= 2022 Malaysia Open (badminton) =

Badminton tournament in Malaysia

Tournament details
- Dates: 28 June – 3 July
- Level: Super 750
- Total prize money: US$675,000
- Venue: Axiata Arena
- Location: Kuala Lumpur, Malaysia

Champions
- Men's singles: (Denmark) Viktor Axelsen
- Women's singles: (Thailand) Ratchanok Intanon
- Men's doubles: (Japan) Takuro Hoki (Japan) Yugo Kobayashi
- Women's doubles: (Indonesia) Apriyani Rahayu (Indonesia) Siti Fadia Silva Ramadhanti
- Mixed doubles: (China) Zheng Siwei (China) Huang Yaqiong

The 2022 Malaysia Open (officially known as the Petronas Malaysia Open 2022 for sponsorship reasons) was a badminton tournament that took place at the Axiata Arena, Kuala Lumpur, Malaysia, from 28 June to 3 July 2022 and had a total prize of US$675,000. This was the first edition to take place since 2019.

Viktor Axelsen continued his dominance in the men's singles with a third consecutive title in a month, having won the Indonesia Masters and Indonesia Open. Ratchanok Intanon won her first World Tour tournament title since the 2020 Indonesia Masters. Takuro Hoki and Yugo Kobayashi won their first Malaysia Open title, and so did Apriyani Rahayu and Siti Fadia Silva Ramadhanti. The latter's win was Indonesia's first title in Malaysia Open women's doubles since 1967. In mixed doubles, Zheng Siwei and Huang Yaqiong retained the title for the third consecutive edition; Zheng became the most successful mixed doubles player in the tournament's history with four titles in a row, having also won in 2017.

== Tournament ==
The 2022 Malaysia Open was the twelfth tournament of the 2022 BWF World Tour and was part of the Malaysia Open championships, which had been held since 1937. This tournament was organized by the Badminton Association of Malaysia with sanction from the BWF.

=== Venue ===
This international tournament was held at the Axiata Arena inside the KL Sports City in Kuala Lumpur, Malaysia.

=== Point distribution ===
Below is the point distribution table for each phase of the tournament based on the BWF points system for the BWF World Tour Super 750 event.

| Winner | Runner-up | 3/4 | 5/8 | 9/16 | 17/32 |
|---|---|---|---|---|---|
| 11,000 | 9,350 | 7,700 | 6,050 | 4,320 | 2,660 |

=== Prize pool ===
The total prize money was US$650,000 with the distribution of the prize money in accordance with BWF regulations.

| Event | Winner | Finalist | Semi-finals | Quarter-finals | Last 16 | Last 32 |
| Singles | $47,250 | $22,950 | $9,450 | $3,712.50 | $2,025 | $675 |
| Doubles | $49,950 | $23,625 | $9,450 | $4218.75 | $2,193.75 | $675 |

== Men's singles ==
=== Seeds ===
1. (Denmark) Viktor Axelsen (champion)
2. (Japan) Kento Momota (final)
3. (Denmark) Anders Antonsen (withdrew)
4. (Chinese Taipei) Chou Tien-chen (second round)
5. (Malaysia) Lee Zii Jia (second round)
6. (Indonesia) Anthony Sinisuka Ginting (quarter-finals)
7. (Indonesia) Jonatan Christie (semi-finals)
8. (India) Lakshya Sen (withdrew)

=== Finals ===
Semi-finals
1 | (Denmark) Viktor Axelsen | 21 | 20 | 21
7 | (Indonesia) Jonatan Christie | 15 | 22 | 11
(Thailand) Kunlavut Vitidsarn | 11 | 12
2 | (Japan) Kento Momota | 21 | 21

Final
1 | (Denmark) Viktor Axelsen | 21 | 21
2 | (Japan) Kento Momota | 4 | 7

=== Top half ===
==== Section 1 ====
First round
1 | (Denmark) V Axelsen | 22 | 21
PFR | (France) B Leverdez | 20 | 7
(Hong Kong) Lee C Y | 21 | 21
(Singapore) Loh K Y | 19 | 12
6 | (Indonesia) A S Ginting | 21 | 19 | 21
(India) B. Sai Praneeth | 15 | 21 | 9
PFR | (Indonesia) C A Dwi Wardoyo | 16 | 21 | 19
(Thailand) S Thammasin | 21 | 16 | 21

Second round
1 | (Denmark) V Axelsen | 15 | 21 | 21
(Hong Kong) Lee C Y | 21 | 6 | 13
6 | (Indonesia) A S Ginting | 21 | 21
(Thailand) S Thammasin | 18 | 18

Quarter-finals
1 | (Denmark) V Axelsen | 18 | 21 | 21
6 | (Indonesia) A S Ginting | 21 | 17 | 12

==== Section 2 ====
First round
4 | (Chinese Taipei) Chou T-c | 21 | 21
(Canada) B Yang | 16 | 9
(Malaysia) Liew D | 14 | 21 | 18
(India) Prannoy H. S. | 21 | 17 | 21
7 | (Indonesia) J Christie | 21 | 13 | 21
(India) S Verma | 14 | 21 | 7
(Indonesia) T Sugiarto | 21 | 18 | 20
(Japan) K Nishimoto | 15 | 21 | 22

Second round
4 | (Chinese Taipei) Chou T-c | 15 | 7
(India) Prannoy H. S. | 21 | 21
7 | (Indonesia) J Christie | 21 | 21
(Japan) K Nishimoto | 18 | 17

Quarter-finals
(India) Prannoy H. S. | 18 | 16
7 | (Indonesia) J Christie | 21 | 21

=== Bottom half ===
==== Section 3 ====
First round
(China) Zhao JP | 19 | 21 | 15
(Thailand) K Vitidsarn | 21 | 14 | 21
(South Korea) Heo K-h | 12 | 17
PFR | (India) Parupalli K | 21 | 21
(Chinese Taipei) Wang T-w | 21 | 21
(Guatemala) K Cordón | 17 | 7
(China) Lu GZ | 21 | 21 | 21
PFR | (Malaysia) Ng T Y | 16 | 23 | 18

Second round
(Thailand) K Vitidsarn | 21 | 21
PFR | (India) Parupalli K | 19 | 10
(Chinese Taipei) Wang T-w | 18 | 11
(China) Lu GZ | 21 | 21

Quarter-finals
(Thailand) K Vitidsarn | 15 | 21 | 21
(China) Lu GZ | 21 | 10 | 17

==== Section 4 ====
First round
(Denmark) R Gemke | 21 | 9^{r}
(Indonesia) S H Rhustavito | 15 | 11
PFR | (Republic of Ireland) N Nguyen | 15 | 11
5 | (Malaysia) Lee Z J | 21 | 21
(Hong Kong) Ng K L | 21 | 21
(Netherlands) M Caljouw | 18 | 16
(Thailand) K Wangcharoen
2 | (Japan) K Momota | w | / | o

Second round
(Indonesia) S H Rhustavito | 21 | 19 | 21
5 | (Malaysia) Lee Z J | 19 | 21 | 16
(Hong Kong) Ng K L | 21 | 8 | 18
2 | (Japan) K Momota | 11 | 21 | 21

Quarter-finals
(Indonesia) S H Rhustavito | 6^{r}
2 | (Japan) K Momota | 13

== Women's singles ==
=== Seeds ===
1. (Japan) Akane Yamaguchi (first round)
2. (Chinese Taipei) Tai Tzu-ying (semi-finals)
3. (South Korea) An Se-young (second round)
4. (China) Chen Yufei (final)
5. (Spain) Carolina Marín (second round)
6. (Japan) Nozomi Okuhara (quarter-finals)
7. (India) P. V. Sindhu (quarter-finals)
8. (Thailand) Ratchanok Intanon (champion)

=== Finals ===
Semi-finals
(China) Wang Zhiyi | 8 | 18
8 | (Thailand) Ratchanok Intanon | 21 | 21
4 | (China) Chen Yufei | 19 | 21 | 21
2 | (Chinese Taipei) Tai Tzu-ying | 21 | 13 | 15

Final
8 | (Thailand) Ratchanok Intanon | 21 | 13 | 21
4 | (China) Chen Yufei | 15 | 21 | 16

=== Top half ===
==== Section 1 ====
First round
1 | (Japan) A Yamaguchi | 14 | 14
(Indonesia) G M Tunjung | 21 | 21
(China) He BJ | 21 | 21 | 11
(China) Wang ZY | 23 | 9 | 21
5 | (Spain) C Marín | 21 | 21
(France) Qi XF | 7 | 16
PFR | (Indonesia) P K Wardani | 14 | 21 | 16
(Denmark) L Kjærsfeldt | 21 | 10 | 21

Second round
(Indonesia) G M Tunjung | 19 | 13
(China) Wang ZY | 21 | 21
5 | (Spain) C Marín | 19 | 21 | 13
(Denmark) L Kjærsfeldt | 21 | 19 | 21

Quarter-finals
(China) Wang ZY | 9 | 21 | 21
(Denmark) L Kjærsfeldt | 21 | 10 | 17

==== Section 2 ====
First round
3 | (South Korea) An S-y | 21 | 21
(Singapore) Yeo J M | 12 | 15
(Denmark) L Christophersen | 21 | 14 | 8
(China) Han Y | 12 | 21 | 21
8 | (Thailand) R Intanon | 24 | 21 | 22
(South Korea) Sim Y-j | 26 | 4 | 20
(Denmark) J D Jakobsen | 13 | 18
(United States) BW Zhang | 21 | 21

Second round
3 | (South Korea) An S-y | 23 | 18 | 16
(China) Han Y | 21 | 21 | 21
8 | (Thailand) R Intanon | 15 | 21 | 21
(United States) BW Zhang | 21 | 12 | 18

Quarter-finals
(China) Han Y | 20 | 12
8 | (Thailand) R Intanon | 22 | 21

=== Bottom half ===
==== Section 3 ====
First round
(India) S Nehwal | 11 | 17
(United States) I Wang | 21 | 21
(Germany) Y Li | 13 | 9
6 | (Japan) N Okuhara | 21 | 21
(South Korea) Kim G-e | 20 | 14
(Thailand) B Ongbamrungphan | 22 | 21
(China) Zhang YM | 18 | 8
4 | (China) Chen YF | 21 | 21

Second round
(United States) I Wang | 21 | 18
6 | (Japan) N Okuhara | 23 | 21
(Thailand) B Ongbamrungphan | 12 | 19
4 | (China) Chen YF | 21 | 21

Quarter-finals
6 | (Japan) N Okuhara | 21 | 18 | 18
4 | (China) Chen YF | 14 | 21 | 21

==== Section 4 ====
First round
(Thailand) P Chaiwan | 21 | 21
(Indonesia) Fitriani | 18 | 15
(Thailand) P Chochuwong | 13 | 17
7 | (India) P. V. Sindhu | 21 | 21
(Canada) M Li | 12 | 18
PFR | (Estonia) K Kuuba | 21 | 21
(Belgium) L Tan | 13 | 9
2 | (Chinese Taipei) Tai T-y | 21 | 21

Second round
(Thailand) P Chaiwan | 21 | 9 | 14
7 | (India) P. V. Sindhu | 19 | 21 | 21
PFR | (Estonia) K Kuuba | 11 | 9
2 | (Chinese Taipei) Tai T-y | 21 | 21

Quarter-finals
7 | (India) P. V. Sindhu | 21 | 15 | 13
2 | (Chinese Taipei) Tai T-y | 13 | 21 | 21

== Men's doubles ==
=== Seeds ===
1. (Indonesia) Marcus Fernaldi Gideon / Kevin Sanjaya Sukamuljo (withdrew)
2. (Japan) Takuro Hoki / Yugo Kobayashi (champions)
3. (Indonesia) Mohammad Ahsan / Hendra Setiawan (quarter-finals)
4. (Chinese Taipei) Lee Yang / Wang Chi-lin (second round)
5. (Malaysia) Aaron Chia / Soh Wooi Yik (semi-finals)
6. (Indonesia) Fajar Alfian / Muhammad Rian Ardianto (final)
7. (India) Satwiksairaj Rankireddy / Chirag Shetty (second round)
8. (Denmark) Kim Astrup / Anders Skaarup Rasmussen (first round)

=== Finals ===
Semi-finals
(Malaysia) Goh Sze Fei (Malaysia) Nur Izzuddin | 14 | 12
6 | (Indonesia) Fajar Alfian (Indonesia) Muhammad Rian Ardianto | 21 | 21
5 | (Malaysia) Aaron Chia (Malaysia) Soh Wooi Yik | 21 | 9
2 | (Japan) Takuro Hoki (Japan) Yugo Kobayashi | 23 | 21

Final
6 | (Indonesia) Fajar Alfian (Indonesia) Muhammad Rian Ardianto | 22 | 21 | 9
2 | (Japan) Takuro Hoki (Japan) Yugo Kobayashi | 24 | 16 | 21

=== Top half ===
==== Section 1 ====
First round
PFR | (Malaysia) Tan K M (Malaysia) Tan W K | 18 | 21 | 21
(Denmark) J Bay (Denmark) L Mølhede | 21 | 15 | 17
PFR | (Malaysia) Chang Y J (Malaysia) Yap R K | 14 | 18
(China) Liu YC (China) Ou XY | 21 | 21
7 | (India) S Rankireddy (India) C Shetty | 21 | 21
(Malaysia) Man W C (Malaysia) Tee K W | 18 | 11
(Japan) K Matsui (Japan) Y Takeuchi | 12 | 12
(Malaysia) Goh S F (Malaysia) N Izzuddin | 21 | 21

Second round
PFR | (Malaysia) Tan K M (Malaysia) Tan W K | 18 | 21 | 14
(China) Liu YC (China) Ou XY | 21 | 17 | 21
7 | (India) S Rankireddy (India) C Shetty
(Malaysia) Goh S F (Malaysia) N Izzuddin | w | / | o

Quarter-finals
(China) Liu YC (China) Ou XY | 11 | 20
(Malaysia) Goh S F (Malaysia) N Izzuddin | 21 | 22

==== Section 2 ====
First round
4 | (Chinese Taipei) Lee Y (Chinese Taipei) Wang C-l | 21 | 21
(Netherlands) R Jille (Netherlands) T van der Lecq | 9 | 15
PFR | (Malaysia) J Arif (Malaysia) M Haikal | 19 | 13
(Malaysia) Ong Y S (Malaysia) Teo E Y | 21 | 21
6 | (Indonesia) F Alfian (Indonesia) M R Ardianto | 21 | 21
(Malaysia) Goh V S (Malaysia) Low J S | 18 | 9
(Germany) M Lamsfuß (Germany) M Seidel | 19 | 21 | 21
(Republic of Ireland) J Magee (Republic of Ireland) P Reynolds | 21 | 10 | 15

Second round
4 | (Chinese Taipei) Lee Y (Chinese Taipei) Wang C-l | 17 | 18
(Malaysia) Ong Y S (Malaysia) Teo E Y | 21 | 21
6 | (Indonesia) F Alfian (Indonesia) M R Ardianto | 21 | 21 | 21
(Germany) M Lamsfuß (Germany) M Seidel | 23 | 14 | 14

Quarter-finals
(Malaysia) Ong Y S (Malaysia) Teo E Y | 13 | 9
6 | (Indonesia) F Alfian (Indonesia) M R Ardianto | 21 | 21

=== Bottom half ===
==== Section 3 ====
First round
(Singapore) T Hee (Singapore) Loh K H | 21 | 21
(South Korea) Kang M-h (South Korea) Seo S-j | 14 | 19
(Japan) A Koga (Japan) T Saito | 18 | 19
5 | (Malaysia) A Chia (Malaysia) Soh W Y | 21 | 21
(China) He JT (China) Zhou HD | 21 | 21
PFR | (Malaysia) Boon X Y (Malaysia) Wong T C | 10 | 12
(China) Ren XY (China) Tan Q | 21 | 15 | 14
3 | (Indonesia) M Ahsan (Indonesia) H Setiawan | 17 | 21 | 21

Second round
(Singapore) T Hee (Singapore) Loh K H | 16 | 13
5 | (Malaysia) A Chia (Malaysia) Soh W Y | 21 | 21
(China) He JT (China) Zhou HD | 13 | 10
3 | (Indonesia) M Ahsan (Indonesia) H Setiawan | 21 | 21

Quarter-finals
5 | (Malaysia) A Chia (Malaysia) Soh W Y | 21 | 20 | 21
3 | (Indonesia) M Ahsan (Indonesia) H Setiawan | 13 | 22 | 19

==== Section 4 ====
First round
(Malaysia) N M Azriyn A (Malaysia) Lim K W | 21 | 14 | 13
(Thailand) S Jomkoh (Thailand) K Kedren | 15 | 21 | 21
(South Korea) Choi S-g (South Korea) Kim W-h | 24 | 14 | 21
8 | (Denmark) K Astrup (Denmark) A S Rasmussen | 22 | 21 | 17
PFR | (Germany) J R Jansen (Germany) J C Völker | 19 | 6
(Indonesia) M S Fikri (Indonesia) B Maulana | 21 | 21
(Chinese Taipei) Lu C-y (Chinese Taipei) Yang P-ha | 21 | 16 | 13
2 | (Japan) T Hoki (Japan) Y Kobayashi | 14 | 21 | 21

Second round
(Thailand) S Jomkoh (Thailand) K Kedren | 21 | 11 | 23
(South Korea) Choi S-g (South Korea) Kim W-h | 18 | 21 | 25
(Indonesia) M S Fikri (Indonesia) B Maulana | 21 | 13 | 19
2 | (Japan) T Hoki (Japan) Y Kobayashi | 18 | 21 | 21

Quarter-finals
(South Korea) Choi S-g (South Korea) Kim W-h | 14 | 23 | 14
2 | (Japan) T Hoki (Japan) Y Kobayashi | 21 | 21 | 21

== Women's doubles ==
=== Seeds ===
1. (China) Chen Qingchen / Jia Yifan (quarter-finals)
2. (South Korea) Lee So-hee / Shin Seung-chan (second round)
3. (South Korea) Kim So-yeong / Kong Hee-yong (withdrew)
4. (Japan) Yuki Fukushima / Sayaka Hirota (withdrew)
5. (Japan) Mayu Matsumoto / Wakana Nagahara (semi-finals)
6. (Japan) Nami Matsuyama / Chiharu Shida (second round)
7. (Thailand) Jongkolphan Kititharakul / Rawinda Prajongjai (first round)
8. (Bulgaria) Gabriela Stoeva / Stefani Stoeva (second round)

=== Finals ===
Semi-finals
(Indonesia) Apriyani Rahayu (Indonesia) Siti Fadia Silva Ramadhanti | 21 | 22
(South Korea) Jeong Na-eun (South Korea) Kim Hye-jeong | 14 | 20
(China) Zhang Shuxian (China) Zheng Yu | 11 | 21 | 21
5 | (Japan) Mayu Matsumoto (Japan) Wakana Nagahara | 21 | 19 | 17

Final
(Indonesia) Apriyani Rahayu (Indonesia) Siti Fadia Silva Ramadhanti | 21 | 12 | 21
(China) Zhang Shuxian (China) Zheng Yu | 18 | 21 | 19

=== Top half ===
==== Section 1 ====
First round
1 | (China) Chen QC (China) Jia YF | 21 | 21
(Thailand) B Aimsaard (Thailand) N Aimsaard | 17 | 8
(Malaysia) Low Y Y (Malaysia) V Siow | 17 | 21 | 21
(Germany) L Efler (Germany) I Lohau | 21 | 16 | 19
6 | (Japan) N Matsuyama (Japan) C Shida | 21 | 21
(India) A Ponnappa (India) N. S Reddy | 15 | 11
(Indonesia) A Rahayu (Indonesia) S F S Ramadhanti | 22 | 21
PFR | (Germany) S Küspert (Germany) E Moszczynski | 20 | 9

Second round
1 | (China) Chen QC (China) Jia YF | 21 | 21
(Malaysia) Low Y Y (Malaysia) V Siow | 12 | 9
6 | (Japan) N Matsuyama (Japan) C Shida | 16 | 15
(Indonesia) A Rahayu (Indonesia) S F S Ramadhanti | 21 | 21

Quarter-finals
1 | (China) Chen QC (China) Jia YF | 21 | 13 | 16
(Indonesia) A Rahayu (Indonesia) S F S Ramadhanti | 14 | 21 | 21

==== Section 2 ====
First round
PFR | (United States) F Corbett (United States) A Lee | 21 | 16 | 11
(Indonesia) F D Kusuma (Indonesia) A C Pratiwi | 18 | 21 | 21
(China) Du Y (China) Li WM | 21 | 21
(Brazil) J Lima (Brazil) S Lima | 4 | 7
8 | (Bulgaria) G Stoeva (Bulgaria) S Stoeva | 21 | 21
(Ukraine) M Stoliarenko (Ukraine) Y Zharka | 14 | 18
(India) H M Harinarayanan (India) A Roy | 7 | 12
(South Korea) Jeong N-e (South Korea) Kim H-j | 21 | 21

Second round
(Indonesia) F D Kusuma (Indonesia) A C Pratiwi | 21 | 16 | 21
(China) Du Y (China) Li WM | 19 | 21 | 23
8 | (Bulgaria) G Stoeva (Bulgaria) S Stoeva | 14 | 13
(South Korea) Jeong N-e (South Korea) Kim H-j | 21 | 21

Quarter-finals
(China) Du Y (China) Li WM | 13 | 15
(South Korea) Jeong N-e (South Korea) Kim H-j | 21 | 21

=== Bottom half ===
==== Section 3 ====
First round
(China) Liu XX (China) Xia YT | 20 | 14
(Malaysia) P Tan (Malaysia) Thinaah M | 22 | 21
(China) Zhang SX (China) Zheng Y | 21 | 21
7 | (Thailand) J Kititharakul (Thailand) R Prajongjai | 10 | 8
(Malaysia) V Hoo (Malaysia) Lim C S | 18 | 17
(Indonesia) F V D Gani (Indonesia) R Sugiarto | 21 | 21
(India) S Gurazada (United States) I Jaiswal | w | / | o
4 | (Japan) Y Fukushima (Japan) S Hirota

Second round
(Malaysia) P Tan (Malaysia) Thinaah M | 19 | 14
(China) Zhang SX (China) Zheng Y | 21 | 21
(Indonesia) F V D Gani (Indonesia) R Sugiarto | 21 | 21
(India) S Gurazada (United States) I Jaiswal | 12 | 8

Quarter-finals
(China) Zhang SX (China) Zheng Y | 21 | 21
(Indonesia) F V D Gani (Indonesia) R Sugiarto | 13 | 14

==== Section 4 ====
First round
(Thailand) O Jongsathapornparn (Thailand) A Povanon
PFR | (Thailand) S Paewsampran (Thailand) P Supajirakul | w | / | o
(India) K. A Bhat (India) S Gautam | 11 | 14
5 | (Japan) M Matsumoto (Japan) W Nagahara | 21 | 21
(Malaysia) A Cheong (Malaysia) Teoh M X | 21 | 21
(Republic of Ireland) K Frost (Republic of Ireland) M Ryan | 12 | 5
(France) M Lambert (France) A Tran | 16 | 8
2 | (South Korea) Lee S-h (South Korea) Shin S-c | 21 | 21

Second round
PFR | (Thailand) S Paewsampran (Thailand) P Supajirakul | 8 | 13
5 | (Japan) M Matsumoto (Japan) W Nagahara | 21 | 21
(Malaysia) A Cheong (Malaysia) Teoh M X | 18 | 21 | 21
2 | (South Korea) Lee S-h (South Korea) Shin S-c | 21 | 12 | 15

Quarter-finals
5 | (Japan) M Matsumoto (Japan) W Nagahara | 21 | 23
(Malaysia) A Cheong (Malaysia) Teoh M X | 15 | 21

== Mixed doubles ==
=== Seeds ===
1. (Thailand) Dechapol Puavaranukroh / Sapsiree Taerattanachai (final)
2. (China) Zheng Siwei / Huang Yaqiong (champions)
3. (Japan) Yuta Watanabe / Arisa Higashino (first round)
4. (China) Wang Yilyu / Huang Dongping (semi-finals)
5. (Indonesia) Praveen Jordan / Melati Daeva Oktavianti (withdrew)
6. (Hong Kong) Tang Chun Man / Tse Ying Suet (quarter-finals)
7. (Malaysia) Tan Kian Meng / Lai Pei Jing (first round)
8. (France) Thom Gicquel / Delphine Delrue (quarter-finals)

=== Finals ===
Semi-finals
1 | (Thailand) Dechapol Puavaranukroh (Thailand) Sapsiree Taerattanachai | 23 | 19 | 21
4 | (China) Wang Yilyu (China) Huang Dongping | 21 | 21 | 14
(Denmark) Mathias Christiansen (Denmark) Alexandra Bøje | 18 | 8
2 | (China) Zheng Siwei (China) Huang Yaqiong | 21 | 21

Final
1 | (Thailand) Dechapol Puavaranukroh (Thailand) Sapsiree Taerattanachai | 13 | 18
2 | (China) Zheng Siwei (China) Huang Yaqiong | 21 | 21

=== Top half ===
==== Section 1 ====
First round
1 | (Thailand) D Puavaranukroh (Thailand) S Taerattanachai | 21 | 21
(Germany) M Lamsfuß (Germany) I Lohau | 17 | 7
(Japan) K Yamashita (Japan) N Shinoya | 8 | 21 | 22
(Thailand) S Jomkoh (Thailand) S Paewsampran | 21 | 11 | 24
6 | (Hong Kong) Tang C M (Hong Kong) Tse Y S | 21 | 21
(Malaysia) Choong H J (Malaysia) Peck Y W | 18 | 18
(Indonesia) R Rivaldy (Indonesia) P H Mentari | 9 | 21 | 22
(Malaysia) Chan P S (Malaysia) Cheah Y S | 21 | 12 | 20

Second round
1 | (Thailand) D Puavaranukroh (Thailand) S Taerattanachai | 21 | 21
(Thailand) S Jomkoh (Thailand) S Paewsampran | 18 | 14
6 | (Hong Kong) Tang C M (Hong Kong) Tse Y S | 21 | 21
(Indonesia) R Rivaldy (Indonesia) P H Mentari | 13 | 10

Quarter-finals
1 | (Thailand) D Puavaranukroh (Thailand) S Taerattanachai | 21 | 21
6 | (Hong Kong) Tang C M (Hong Kong) Tse Y S | 13 | 14

==== Section 2 ====
First round
4 | (China) Wang YL (China) Huang DP | 21 | 21
(Brazil) F Farias (Brazil) J Lima | 11 | 14
(Hong Kong) Chang T C (Hong Kong) Ng W Y | 21 | 21 | 18
(Indonesia) R N Kusharjanto (Indonesia) L A Kusumawati | 23 | 8 | 21
7 | (Malaysia) Tan K M (Malaysia) Lai P J | 18 | 21 | 18
(Malaysia) Goh S H (Malaysia) S J Lai | 21 | 19 | 21
(South Korea) Kim W-h (South Korea) Jeong N-e | 21 | 21
(India) V G Prasad (India) J Dewangan | 15 | 9

Second round
4 | (China) Wang YL (China) Huang DP | 21 | 21
(Indonesia) R N Kusharjanto (Indonesia) L A Kusumawati | 19 | 11
(Malaysia) Goh S H (Malaysia) S J Lai | 21 | 18 | 17
(South Korea) Kim W-h (South Korea) Jeong N-e | 10 | 21 | 21

Quarter-finals
4 | (China) Wang YL (China) Huang DP | 21 | 21
(South Korea) Kim W-h (South Korea) Jeong N-e | 8 | 16

=== Bottom half ===
==== Section 3 ====
First round
PFR | (India) B S Reddy (India) A Ponnappa | 15 | 21 | 17
(Netherlands) R Tabeling (Netherlands) S Piek | 21 | 19 | 21
(Denmark) M Mikkelsen (Denmark) R Søby Hansen | 16 | 20
PFR | (France) W Villeger (France) A Tran | 21 | 22
(Indonesia) H Faizal (Indonesia) S Kani | 14 | 18
(Singapore) T Hee (Singapore) Tan W H | 21 | 21
(Denmark) M Christiansen (Denmark) A Bøje | 15 | 21 | 22
3 | (Japan) Y Watanabe (Japan) A Higashino | 21 | 17 | 20

Second round
(Netherlands) R Tabeling (Netherlands) S Piek | 21 | 21
PFR | (France) W Villeger (France) A Tran | 14 | 12
(Singapore) T Hee (Singapore) Tan W H | 14 | 16
(Denmark) M Christiansen (Denmark) A Bøje | 21 | 21

Quarter-finals
(Netherlands) R Tabeling (Netherlands) S Piek | 19 | 12
(Denmark) M Christiansen (Denmark) A Bøje | 21 | 21

==== Section 4 ====
First round
(Germany) J R Jansen (Germany) L Efler | 21 | 21
(Malaysia) Soong J V (Malaysia) Goh L Y | 17 | 18
(China) Guo XW (China) Zhang SX | 15 | 21 | 16
8 | (France) T Gicquel (France) D Delrue | 21 | 19 | 21
(Japan) Y Kaneko (Japan) M Matsutomo | 16 | 21 | 10
(Malaysia) Chen T J (Malaysia) V Siow | 21 | 14 | 21
(Malaysia) Hoo P R (Malaysia) Toh E W | 17 | 18
2 | (China) Zheng SW (China) Huang YQ | 21 | 21

Second round
(Germany) J R Jansen (Germany) L Efler | 21 | 18
8 | (France) T Gicquel (France) D Delrue | 23 | 21
(Malaysia) Chen T J (Malaysia) V Siow | 16 | 10
2 | (China) Zheng SW (China) Huang YQ | 21 | 21

Quarter-finals
8 | (France) T Gicquel (France) D Delrue | 23 | 20
2 | (China) Zheng SW (China) Huang YQ | 25 | 22

| Preceded by 2022 Indonesia Open | BWF World Tour; 2022 BWF season | Succeeded by 2022 Malaysia Masters |
