= Triathlon at the 2022 Asian Games – Women's individual =

Women's individual at the 2022 Asian Games
- Venue: Chun'an Jieshou Sports Centre
- Date: 30 September 2023
- Competitors: 21 from 13 nations

Medalists
gold medal	Yuko Takahashi	Japan
silver medal	Lin Xinyu	China
bronze medal	Yang Yifan	China

The women's triathlon was part of the Triathlon at the 2022 Asian Games program, was held on 30 September 2023. The race was held over the "international distance" and consisted of 1,500 metres (0.93 mi) swimming, 40 kilometres (25 mi) road bicycle racing, and 10 kilometres (6.2 mi) road running.

== Schedule ==
All times are China Standard Time (UTC+08:00)

Date	Time	Event
Saturday, 30 September 2023	08:00	Final

== Results ==
Legend

- DNF — Did not finish

Rank	Athlete	Swim 1.5 km	Trans. 1	Bike 40 km	Trans. 2	Run 10 km	Total time
1st place, gold medalist(s)	Yuko Takahashi (JPN)	19:11	0:40	1:02:04	0:23	38:46	2:01:04
2nd place, silver medalist(s)	Lin Xinyu (CHN)	19:55	0:37	1:02:27	0:27	38:04	2:01:30
3rd place, bronze medalist(s)	Yang Yifan (CHN)	19:57	0:36	1:02:26	0:31	39:01	2:02:31
4	Ekaterina Shabalina (KAZ)	20:46	0:37	1:03:33	0:25	37:51	2:03:12
5	Yuka Sato (JPN)	20:09	0:39	1:04:09	0:25	38:53	2:04:15
6	Bailee Brown (HKG)	19:58	0:36	1:02:25	0:31	40:58	2:04:28
7	Jeong Hye-rim (KOR)	20:45	0:38	1:03:34	0:25	41:20	2:06:42
8	Kim Ji-yeon (KOR)	20:35	0:37	1:03:45	0:26	43:01	2:08:24
9	Arina Shulgina (KAZ)	21:49	0:39	1:06:11	0:25	41:08	2:10:12
10	Alina Khakimova (UZB)	21:54	0:39	1:05:49	0:29	41:59	2:10:50
11	Hoi Long (MAC)	21:51	0:38	1:05:53	0:25	42:23	2:11:10
12	Irina Juldybina (UZB)	21:52	0:36	1:06:09	0:29	43:27	2:12:33
13	Kim Mangrobang (PHI)	21:47	0:39	1:06:11	0:26	44:46	2:13:49
14	Lydia Musleh (JOR)	20:36	0:40	1:07:23	0:31	50:57	2:20:07
15	Cheng Wan U (MAC)	21:53	0:42	1:06:06	0:30	51:59	2:21:10
16	Raven Alcoseba (PHI)	20:49	0:40	1:07:10	0:29	54:57	2:24:05
17	Shrebi Maharjan (NEP)	22:28	0:41	1:14:24	0:35	47:05	2:25:13
—	Huda Al-Saleh (KUW)	32:16	0:52				Lapped
—	Hana Al-Nabulsi (UAE)	33:09	1:06				Lapped
—	Thorn Somavattey (CAM)	29:48	0:46				Lapped
—	Maryam Shaban (JOR)	26:19	0:51				DNF
