= Cycling at the 2025 Summer Deaflympics =

Deaflympics event

- Venue: Japan Cycle Sports Centre, Japan
- Dates: 17–22 November 2025

Cycling at the 2025 Summer Deaflympics was held at the Japan Cycle Sports Centre in Shizuoka, Japan from 17 to 22 November 2025.

12 medal events were held, consists of eight road cycling events and four mountain biking events.

== Medal table ==
* Host nation (Japan)

Rank	NOC	Gold	Silver	Bronze	Total
1	Individual Neutral Athletes	8	3	2	13
2	China	2	4	2	8
3	France	1	0	0	1
3	Macau	1	0	0	1
5	Ukraine	0	2	1	3
6	Germany	0	1	1	2
6	Portugal	0	1	1	2
6	South Korea	0	1	1	2
9	Poland	0	0	2	2
10	Japan*	0	0	1	1
10	United States	0	0	1	1
Totals (11 entries)		12	12	12	36

== Medalists ==
=== Road cycling ===
Event	Gold	Silver	Bronze
Men's sprint	Jayson Wallace; France	Song Jiaojiao; China	Gao Xiang; China
Men's points race	Dmitry Rozanov; Individual Neutral Athletes	Ko Byung-wook; South Korea	André Soares; Portugal
Men's individual time trial	Dmitry Rozanov; Individual Neutral Athletes	André Soares; Portugal	Ko Byung-wook; South Korea
Men's individual road race	Dmitry Rozanov; Individual Neutral Athletes	Egor Gavrilov; Individual Neutral Athletes	Musashi Fujimoto; Japan
Women's sprint	Alisa Bondareva; Individual Neutral Athletes	Wang Qiqi; China	Yelisaveta Topchaniuk; Ukraine
Women's point race	Meng Yan; China	Wang Qiqi; China	Bianca Metz; Germany
Women's individual time trial	Hoi Long; Macau	Bianca Metz; Germany	Wang Qiqi; China
Women's individual road race	Meng Yan; China	Wang Qiqi; China	Elizaveta Bavykina; Individual Neutral Athletes

=== Mountain biking ===
Event	Gold	Silver	Bronze
Men's cross-country short track	Aleksei Kudrin; Individual Neutral Athletes	Aleksei Bozhko; Individual Neutral Athletes	Pawel Arciszewski; Poland
Men's cross-country Olympic	Aleksei Kudrin; Individual Neutral Athletes	Aleksei Bozhko; Individual Neutral Athletes	John Klish; United States
Women's cross-country short track	Anna Poretskova; Individual Neutral Athletes	Yelisaveta Topchaniuk; Ukraine	Patrycja Kuczynska; Poland
Women's cross-country Olympic	Elizaveta Bavykina; Individual Neutral Athletes	Yelisaveta Topchaniuk; Ukraine	Anna Poretskova; Individual Neutral Athletes
