= Macau at the 2018 Asian Games =

- IOC code: MAC
- NOC: Sports and Olympic Committee of Macau, China

in Jakarta and Palembang August 18 – September 2
- Competitors: 110 in 16 sports
- Flag bearer: Sio Ka Kun
- Officials: 56
- Medals Ranked 26th: Gold 1 Silver 2 Bronze 2 Total 5

Asian Games appearances (overview)
- 1990; 1994; 1998; 2002; 2006; 2010; 2014; 2018; 2022; 2026

Macau, China participated at the 2018 Asian Games in Jakarta and Palembang, Indonesia, from 18 August to 2 September 2018. The territory have prepared more than 120 athletes to compete in 16 event at the Games. Macau announced its team of 110 athletes and 56 officials, medical staff, team leaders, coaches, that will take part in 16 competitions: swimming, diving, artistic swimming, athletics, badminton, bowling, boxing, canoeing, cycling, fencing, golf, judo, karate, squash, table tennis, taekwondo, triathlon, and wushu.

== Medalists ==
The following Macau competitors won medals at the Games.

Medal	Name	Sport	Event	Date
Gold	Huang Junhua	Wushu	Men's nanquan and nangun	21 Aug
Silver	Li Yi	Wushu	Women's changquan	22 Aug
Silver	Sou Soi Lam	Karate	Women's individual kata	25 Aug
Bronze	Wong Sok I	Karate	Women's kumite 55 kg	26 Aug
Bronze	Hoi Long	Triathlon	Women's individual	31 Aug

Medals by sport
Sport	1st place, gold medalist(s)	2nd place, silver medalist(s)	3rd place, bronze medalist(s)	Total
Karate	0	1	1	2
Triathlon	0	0	1	1
Wushu	1	1	0	2
Total	1	2	2	5

Medals by day
Day	Date	1st place, gold medalist(s)	2nd place, silver medalist(s)	3rd place, bronze medalist(s)	Total
1	August 19	0	0	0	0
2	August 20	0	0	0	0
3	August 21	1	0	0	1
4	August 22	0	1	0	1
5	August 23	0	0	0	0
6	August 24	0	0	0	0
7	August 25	0	1	0	1
8	August 26	0	0	1	1
9	August 27	0	0	0	0
10	August 28	0	0	0	0
11	August 29	0	0	0	0
12	August 30	0	0	0	0
13	August 31	0	0	1	1
14	September 1	0	0	0	0
15	September 2	0	0	0	0
Total		1	2	2	5

== Competitors ==
The following is a list of the number of competitors representing Macau that participated at the Games:

Sport	Men	Women	Total
Artistic swimming	—	10	10
Athletics	3	1	4
Badminton	2	2	4
Bowling	6	6	12
Boxing	1	0	1
Canoeing	1	2	3
Cycling	2	1	3
Diving	2	3	5
Fencing	1	4	5
Golf	4	2	6
Judo	1	3	4
Karate	3	3	6
Squash	1	2	3
Swimming	7	7	14
Table tennis	5	5	10
Taekwondo	0	5	5
Triathlon	3	2	5
Wushu	6	3	9
Total	48	61	109

== Artistic swimming ==
Macau entered 10 artistic swimmers to compete at the duet and team events at the Games.

Athlete	Event	Technical routine		Free routine		Total	Rank
Athlete	Event	Points	Rank	Points	Rank	Total	Rank
Lo Wai Lam; Chau Cheng Han; Au Ieong Sin Ieng^{RR}	Duet	68.5963	9	69.9000	9	138.4963	9
Au Ieong Sin Ieng; Chau Cheng Han; Kou Chin; Lei Cheok Ian; Lei Cheuk Sze; Leong Mei Hun; Lo Wai Lam; Zheng Zexuan^{FR} Chan Chi Ian^{RR} Li Ni^{TR}	Team	69.5442	8	72.7333	8	142.2775	8

FR: Reserved in free routine; RR: Reserved in technical and free routines; TR: Reserved in technical routine.

== Athletics ==
Macau athletics team dispatched 4 athletes to participate in the Asian Games which include 2 sprinters and 2 track and field contestants.

== Badminton ==
Macau have selected 2 male and 2 female badminton players to compete in the Asian Games.

Men

Athlete	Event	Round of 64	Round of 32	Round of 16	Quarterfinals	Semifinals	Final	
Athlete	Event	Opposition Score	Opposition Score	Opposition Score	Opposition Score	Opposition Score	Opposition Score	Rank
Pui Pang Fong	Singles	B Munkhbat (MGL); W (21−15, 18−21, 21−14)	D Karunaratne (SRI); L (14−21, 15−21)	did not advance				
Che Pui Ngai; Pui Pang Fong	Doubles	—	S Dias / B Goonethilleka (SRI); L (11−21, 18−21)	did not advance				

Women

Athlete	Event	Round of 32	Round of 16	Quarterfinals	Semifinals	Final	
Athlete	Event	Opposition Score	Opposition Score	Opposition Score	Opposition Score	Opposition Score	Rank
Ng Weng Chi	Singles	G M Tunjung (INA); L (4–21, 7–21)	did not advance				
Gong Xue Xin; Ng Weng Chi	Doubles	Hsu Y-c / Wu T-j (TPE); L (5−21, 12−21)	did not advance				

Mixed

Athlete	Event	Round of 32	Round of 16	Quarterfinals	Semifinals	Final	
Athlete	Event	Opposition Score	Opposition Score	Opposition Score	Opposition Score	Opposition Score	Rank
Che Pui Ngai; Gong Xue Xin	Mixed	S Mohamed / M A Shahurunaz (MDV); W (21–8, 21–8)	Wang YL / Huang DP (CHN); L (7–21, 8–21)	did not advance			

== Bowling ==
Macau competed in the bowling competition with 12 athletes (6 men's and 6 women's).

Men

Athlete	Event	Block 1	Block 2	Total	Rank
Athlete	Event	Result	Result	Total	Rank
Leong Chou Kin; Ho Man Lok; Man Si Kei	Trios	1726	1848	3574	29
Zoe Dias Ma; Tam Tsz Sun; Lee Tak Man	Trios	1835	1814	3649	28
Zoe Dias Ma; Tam Tsz Sun; Lee Tak Man; Leong Chou Kin; Ho Man Lok; Man Si Kei	Team of six	3736	3621	7357	14

Women

Athlete	Event	Block 1	Block 2	Total	Rank	Stepladder final 1	Stepladder final 2	Rank
Athlete	Event	Result	Result	Total	Rank	Opposition Result	Opposition Result	Rank
Wong Son Ian	Masters	1825	1654	3479	16	did not advance		
Wong Son Ian; Che Weng Si; Filomena Choi Kit Tan	Trios	1944	1817	3761	15	—		
Veronica Dias de Souza; Julia Lam Sou Keng; Hui Tong	Trios	1801	1920	3721	19	—		
Wong Son Ian; Che Weng Si; Filomena Choi Kit Tan; Veronica Dias de Souza; Julia Lam Sou Keng; Hui Tong	Team of six	3806	3740	7546	8	—		

== Boxing ==
Ng Kuok Kun represented Macau in the boxing competition at the Games. Although Ng is a professional boxer and has had 13 professional fights, he was eligible to take part in the Asian Games alongside amateurs as he has not had 20 professional fights.

Men

Athlete	Event	Round of 32	Round of 16	Quarterfinals	Semifinals	Final	Rank
Athlete	Event	Opposition Result	Opposition Result	Opposition Result	Opposition Result	Opposition Result	Rank
Ng Kuok Kun	–75 kg	Bye	EF Marcial (PHI); RSC	did not advance			

== Canoeing ==
Macau competed in the canoeing sprint event with 3 athletes (1 men and 2 women's).

=== Sprint ===
Athlete	Event	Heats		Semifinal		Final	
Athlete	Event	Time	Rank	Time	Rank	Time	Rank
Lao Hou Kit	Men's K-1 200 m	48.047	7 QS	44.168	9	did not advance	
Louisa Cheong	Women's C-1 200 m	1:01.268	6 QS	56.166	3	did not advance	
Ng Si Cheng	Women's K-1 200 m	1:03.178	5 QS	58.933	5	did not advance	

Qualification legend: QF=Final; QS=Semifinal

== Cycling ==
Macau prepared 4 athletes for the cycling competition at the Games. Leong Chi Son did not participated in the race.

=== Road ===
Athlete	Event	Final	
Athlete	Event	Time	Rank
Kok Mun Wa	Men's road race	3:31:26	31
Lao Long San	Men's road race	3:36:12	46
Lao Long San	Men's time trial	1:06:12.20	15

=== Track ===
Omnium

Athlete	Event	Scratch race		Tempo race		Elimination race		Points race		Total points	Rank
Athlete	Event	Rank	Points	Rank	Points	Rank	Points	Rank	Points	Total points	Rank
Lao Long San	Men's omnium	2	38	10	1	11	20	11	4	84	7
Au Hoi Ian	Women's omnium	12	18	12	−40	11	20	10	−20	36	10

Madison

Athlete	Event	Points	Laps	Rank
Lao Long San; Kok Mun Wa	Men's madison	DNF	−40	—

== Diving ==
The diving team dispatched 2 male and 3 female athletes to participate in the eight events in the Games.

Men

Athlete	Event	Preliminaries		Final	
Athlete	Event	Points	Rank	Points	Rank
Tang Hio Fong	3 m springboard	244.60	15	did not advance	
Lei Wai Shing; Tang Hio Fong	3 m synchronized springboard	—		274.20	9

Women

Athlete	Event	Preliminaries		Final	
Athlete	Event	Points	Rank	Points	Rank
Choi Sut Kuan	3 m springboard	164.65	12 Q	209.75	9
Leong Sut In	10 m platform	182.50	12 Q	178.05	10
Choi Sut Kuan; Leong Sut Chan	3 m synchronized springboard	—		198.30	8
Leong Sut Chan; Leong Sut In	10 m synchronized platform	—		206.01	8

== Fencing ==
Macau entered 5 foil fencers (1 men and 4 women's) at the Games.

Individual

Athlete	Event	Preliminary		Round of 32	Round of 16	Quarterfinals	Semifinals	Final	
Athlete	Event	Opposition Score	Rank	Opposition Score	Opposition Score	Opposition Score	Opposition Score	Opposition Score	Rank
Hoi Man Kit	Men's foil	Cheng XH (MAS): L 4–5; N Choi (HKG): L 2–5; A Alquradaghi (QAT): W 5–2; Ou F-m (TPE): L 1–5; T Kaliyev (KAZ): L 1–5	5 Q	Hoàng NH (VIE); L 9–15	did not advance				22
Ho Ka U	Women's foil	RA Jaoude (LBN): W 5–3; Fu YT (CHN): L 0–5; K Miyawaki (JPN): L 2–5; P Thongchampa (THA): W 5–2; SK Catantan (PHI): L 1–5	4 Q	KV Cheung (HKG); L 2–15	did not advance				17
Ho Peng I	Women's foil	N Aini (INA): W 5–4; L Al-Hosani (UAE): W 5–0; Liu YW (HKG): L 0–5; Cheng H (TPE): L 2–5; M Shaito (LBN): L 3–5; Jeon H-s (KOR): L 0–5	5 Q	MI Esteban (PHI); L 9–15	did not advance				18

Team

Athlete	Event	Round of 16	Quarterfinals	Semifinals	Final	
Athlete	Event	Opposition Score	Opposition Score	Opposition Score	Opposition Score	Rank
Ho Ka U Ho Peng I Huang Liya; Tang Nga Hei	Women's foil	Lebanon (LBN); L 23–45	did not advance			9

== Golf ==
Macau entered six golfers (4 men's and 2 women's) who competed in the individual and team event. Several national golf associations complained to the Court of Arbitration for Sport that some of the Macau players was a professional golfers, but the CAS ruled that none of the players were professional.

Men

Athlete	Event	Round 1	Round 2	Round 3	Round 4	Total		
Athlete	Event	Score	Score	Score	Score	Score	Par	Rank
Si Ngai	Individual	73	76	76	73	298	+10	37
Hun Pui In	Individual	76	78	80	76	310	+22	54
Xiao Jieyu	Individual	81	81	80	83	325	+37	76
Ao Ka Hou	Individual	83	78	84	73	318	+30	61
Si Ngai; Hun Pui In; Xiao Jieyu; Ao Ka Hou	Team	230	232	236	222	920	+56	13

Women

Athlete	Event	Round 1	Round 2	Round 3	Round 4	Total		
Athlete	Event	Score	Score	Score	Score	Score	Par	Rank
Hun Teng Teng	Individual	88	92	85	80	345	+57	37
Kuan Ieong Sin	Individual	73	73	72	73	291	+3	16
Hun Teng Teng; Kuan Ieong Sin	Team	161	165	157	153	636	+60	11

== Judo ==
Macau put up 4 athletes (1 men and 3 women's) for Judo.

Key:

- 1st number — Ippon
- 2nd number — Waza-ari
- s — Shido

Men

Athlete	Event	Round of 32	Round of 16	Quarterfinals	Semifinals	Repechage	Final / BM	Rank
Athlete	Event	Opposition Result	Opposition Result	Opposition Result	Opposition Result	Opposition Result	Opposition Result	Rank
Lio Chon Hou	–60 kg	Bye	D Amartüvshin (MGL); L 00s3–10	did not advance				

Women

Athlete	Event	Round of 32	Round of 16	Quarterfinals	Semifinals	Repechage	Final / BM	Rank
Athlete	Event	Opposition Result	Opposition Result	Opposition Result	Opposition Result	Opposition Result	Opposition Result	Rank
Wong Ka Lei	–48 kg	—	Xiong Y (CHN); L 00–10	did not advance				
Vong Chi Ieng	–52 kg	Chen C-y (TPE); L 00–11	did not advance					
Tang Lai Man	–63 kg	—	Chen Y-t (TPE); L 00s2–11	did not advance				

== Karate ==
Macau participated in the karate competition with 6 athletes (3 men's and 3 women's).

== Squash ==
Macau put up 3 squash players (1 men and 2 women's) including siblings Liu Tsun Man and Liu Kwai Chi at the Games.

Singles

Athlete	Event	Round of 32	Round of 16	Quarterfinals	Semifinals	Final	
Athlete	Event	Opposition Score	Opposition Score	Opposition Score	Opposition Score	Opposition Score	Rank
Liu Tsun Man	Men's	A Wilant (INA); L 2–3	did not advance				
Liu Kwai Chi	Women's	Choi Y-r (KOR); L 0–3	did not advance				
Yeung Weng Chi	Women's	F Eghtedari (IRI); L 0–3	did not advance				

== Swimming ==
Macau entered 14 swimmers (7 men's and 7 women's) that participate in 37 events at the Games.

Men

Athlete	Event	Heats		Final	
Athlete	Event	Time	Rank	Time	Rank
Chao Man Hou	50 m breaststroke	27.97	7 Q	27.91	6
Chao Man Hou	100 m breaststroke	1:02.23	12	did not advance	
Chao Man Hou	200 m breaststroke	2:15.34	7 Q	2:15.82	7
Chou Kit	50 m breaststroke	29.61	23	did not advance	
Chou Kit	100 m breaststroke	1:05.92	24	did not advance	
Lao Kuan Fong	50 m freestyle	24.50	35	did not advance	
Lao Kuan Fong	50 m butterfly	26.29	32	did not advance	
Lin Sizhuang	100 m freestyle	53.53	34	did not advance	
Lin Sizhuang	200 m butterfly	2:11.16	16	did not advance	
Ngou Pok Man	50 m freestyle	23.67	25	did not advance	
Ngou Pok Man	50 m backstroke	26.53	16	did not advance	
Sio Ka Kun	50 m butterfly	26.11	31	did not advance	
Sio Ka Kun	100 m butterfly	1:00.39	28	did not advance	
Yum Cheng Man	50 m backstroke	28.88	30	did not advance	
Yum Cheng Man	100 m backstroke	1:02.63	22	did not advance	
Chao Man Hou; Ngou Pok Man; Lin Sizhuang; Chou Kit	4 × 100 m freestyle relay	3:29.97	12	did not advance	
Chao Man Hou; Ngou Pok Man; Lin Sizhuang; Chou Kit	4 × 200 m freestyle relay	7:51.00	9	did not advance	
Chao Man Hou; Ngou Pok Man; Lin Sizhuang; Chou Kit	4 × 100 m medley relay	3:50.22	13	did not advance	

Women

Athlete	Event	Heats		Final	
Athlete	Event	Time	Rank	Time	Rank
Cheang Weng Lam	50 m breaststroke	33.93	18	did not advance	
Cheang Weng Lam	100 m breaststroke	1:15.19	17	did not advance	
Cheang Weng Lam	200 m breaststroke	2:48.37	14	did not advance	
Choi Weng Tong	200 m freestyle	2:16.32	20	did not advance	
Kuan I Cheng	50 m butterfly	29.83	17	did not advance	
Kuan I Cheng	50 m butterfly	1:07.94	20	did not advance	
Lei On Kei	50 m freestyle	26.66	15	did not advance	
Lei On Kei	50 m breaststroke	33.24	16	did not advance	
Lei On Kei	100 m breaststroke	1:16.06	19	did not advance	
Long Chi Wai	100 m freestyle	1:02.07	19	did not advance	
Long Chi Wai	200 m freestyle	2:19.04	21	did not advance	
Tan Chi Yan	50 m freestyle	27.17	17	did not advance	
Tan Chi Yan	100 m freestyle	59.62	16	did not advance	
Erica Vong	50 m backstroke	29.87	10	did not advance	
Erica Vong	100 m backstroke	1:05.36	13	did not advance	
Tan Chi Yan; Erica Vong; Lei On Kei; Long Chi Wai	4 × 100 m freestyle relay	3:59.49	8 Q	3:57.65	8
Tan Chi Yan; Choi Weng Tong; Long Chi Wai; Erica Vong	4 × 200 m freestyle relay	9:03.42	8 Q	8:57.83	7
Erica Vong; Cheang Weng Lam; Tan Chi Yan; Lei On Kei	4 × 100 m medley relay	4:26.07	8 Q	4:25.14	6

Mixed

Athlete	Event	Heats		Final	
Athlete	Event	Time	Rank	Time	Rank
Erica Vong; Chao Man Hou; Sio Ka Kun; Tan Chi Yan	4 × 100 m mixed medley relay	4:07.29	9	did not advance	

== Table tennis ==
Macao Table Tennis Association have selected 10 table tennis players (5 men's and 5 women's) to compete at the Games.

Individual

Athlete	Event	Round 1	Round 2	Round of 16	Quarterfinals	Semifinals	Final	
Athlete	Event	Opposition Score	Opposition Score	Opposition Score	Opposition Score	Opposition Score	Opposition Score	Rank
Cheong Chi Cheng	Men's singles	S Shrestha (NEP); W 4–2	Jeong Y-s (KOR); L 0–4	did not advance				
Xiao Zikang	Men's singles	SA Al-Balooshi (UAE); W 4–0	Fan ZD (CHN); L 0–4	did not advance				
Chong Weng I	Women's singles	Bye	S Sawettabut (THA); L 1–4	did not advance				
Tam Sut Fei	Women's singles	N Shrestha (NEP); L 3–4	did not advance					
Cheong Chi Chon; Chong Weng I	Mixed doubles	Bye	An J-s / Cha H-s (PRK); WO	did not advance				
Wang Chun; Cheong Cheng I	Mixed doubles	MA Qureshi / AI Ansari (PAK); W 3–1	Chen C-a / Chen I-c (TPE); L 0–3	did not advance				

Team

Athlete	Event	Group Stage					Quarterfinal	Semifinal	Final	
Athlete	Event	Opposition Score	Opposition Score	Opposition Score	Opposition Score	Rank	Opposition Score	Opposition Score	Opposition Score	Rank
Cheong Chi Cheng; Cheong Chi Chon; Mak Tin Ian; Xiao Zikang; Wang Chun	Men's	Chinese Taipei (TPE); L 0–3	Vietnam (VIE); L 0–3	India (IND); L 0–3	United Arab Emirates (UAE); W 3–1	4	did not advance			
Cheong Cheng I Chong Weng I Wong Choi Chi; Tam Sut Fei; U Sio Mei	Women's	Chinese Taipei (TPE); L 0–3	Indonesia (INA); L 0–3	South Korea (KOR); L 0–3	—	4	did not advance			

== Taekwondo ==
Macau settled 5 women's athletes in the taekwondo competition at the Games. Three taekwondo practitioners competed in the poomsae event, and 2 taekwondo practitioners in the kyorugi event.

Poomsae

Athlete	Event	Round of 16	Quarterfinal	Semifinal	Final	
Athlete	Event	Opposition Score	Opposition Score	Opposition Score	Opposition Score	Rank
Chim Cho Kuan	Women's individual	M Salahshouri (IRI); L 7.59–8.01	did not advance			
Wong Chi Cheng; Wong Lei Lei; Chim Cho Kuan	Women's team	Bye	Thailand; L 7.45–8.24	did not advance		

Kyorugi

Athlete	Event	Round of 32	Round of 16	Quarterfinal	Semifinal	Final	
Athlete	Event	Opposition Score	Opposition Score	Opposition Score	Opposition Score	Opposition Score	Rank
Feng Xiao	Women's −57 kg	N Wasiq (PAK); W 16–2	P Lopez (PHI); L 0–8	did not advance			
Liu Qing	Women's −67 kg	—	S F Yusuf (INA); W 25–21	N Tursunkulova (UZB); L 0–0 ^{SUP}	did not advance		

== Triathlon ==
Macau sent 5 triathletes (3 men's and 2 women's) at the Games.

Individual

Athlete	Event	Swim (1.5 km)	Trans 1	Bike (39.6 km)	Trans 2	Run (10 km)	Total Time	Rank
Chao Man Kit	Men's	20:14	0:28	57:41	0:24	44:05	2:02:52	20
Wong Chin Wa	Men's	21:37	0:28	1:01:53	0:20	37:53	2:02:11	19
Hoi Long	Women's	20:08	0:29	1:02:13	0:25	38:13	2:01:28	3rd place, bronze medalist(s)
Lei Cho Ieng	Women's	25:03	0:31	1:08:44	0:44	52:03	2:27:05	14

Mixed relay

Athletes	Event	Total Times per Athlete (Swim 300 m, Bike 6.3 km, Run 2.1 km)	Total Group Time	Rank
Chao Man Kit; Hoi Long; Lei Cho Ieng; Rogerio Jose Carreira Chiu	Mixed relay	24:34; 24:06; 30:22; 24:13	1:43:15	8

== Wushu ==
Macau have prepared 13 athletes for the wushu competition at the Games, and after the selection the team consists of 9 athletes (6 men's and 3 women's).

Taolu

Athlete	Event	Event 1		Event 2		Total	Rank
Athlete	Event	Result	Rank	Result	Rank	Total	Rank
Song Chi Kuan	Men's changquan	9.68	4	—		9.68	4
Huang Junhua	Men's nanquan and nangun	9.70	3	9.73	1	19.43	1st place, gold medalist(s)
Cheong Pui Seng	Men's taijiquan and taijijian	9.60	11	9.58	11	19.18	11
Wu Nok In	Men's daoshu and gunshu	9.41	10	9.38	9	18.79	10
Li Yi	Women's changquan	9.72	2	—		9.72	2nd place, silver medalist(s)
Sou Cho Ma	Women's changquan	9.70	4	—		9.70	4
Ho Pui Kei	Women's taijiquan and taijijian	9.55	10	8.86	14	18.41	14

Sanda

Athlete	Event	Round of 32	Round of 16	Quarterfinal	Semifinal	Final	
Athlete	Event	Opposition Score	Opposition Score	Opposition Score	Opposition Score	Opposition Score	Rank
Kan Kai Wa	Men's –56 kg	J Go (SGP); W 2–0	Shen GS (CHN); L 0–1	did not advance			
Mio Iat San	Men's –60 kg	Bye	J C Saclag (PHI); L 0–2	did not advance			

Key: * TV – Technical victory.
