= Triathlon at the 2018 Asian Games =

- Venue: Jakabaring Sport City
- Dates: 31 August – 2 September 2018
- Competitors: 81 from 22 nations

Triathlon at the 2018 Asian Games was held at the JSC Lake Jakabaring, Palembang, Indonesia, from 31 August to 2 September. Both men and women competed in individual events, plus a mixed-gendered relay event.

The individual triathlon contained three components: a 1.5 km swim, 40 km cycle, and a 10 km run. The relay event featured teams of four competitors, where each completed a 300 m swim, a 6.3 km cycle, and a 2.1 km run.

== Schedule ==
F	Final

Event↓/Date →	31st Fri	1st Sat	2nd Sun
Men's individual		F	
Women's individual	F		
Mixed relay			F

== Medalists ==
Event	Gold	Silver	Bronze
Men's individual	Jumpei Furuya; Japan	Ayan Beisenbayev; Kazakhstan	Li Mingxu; China
Women's individual	Yuko Takahashi; Japan	Zhong Mengying; China	Hoi Long; Macau
Mixed relay	Japan; Yuka Sato; Jumpei Furuya; Yuko Takahashi; Yuichi Hosoda	South Korea; Jang Yun-jung; Kim Ji-hwan; Park Ye-jin; Heo Min-ho	Hong Kong; Bailee Brown; Law Leong Tim; Hilda Choi; Wong Tsz To

== Medal table ==
Rank	Nation	Gold	Silver	Bronze	Total
1	Japan (JPN)	3	0	0	3
2	China (CHN)	0	1	1	2
3	Kazakhstan (KAZ)	0	1	0	1
3	South Korea (KOR)	0	1	0	1
5	Hong Kong (HKG)	0	0	1	1
5	Macau (MAC)	0	0	1	1
Totals (6 entries)		3	3	3	9

== Participating nations ==
A total of 81 athletes from 22 nations competed in triathlon at the 2018 Asian Games:

- Bahrain (2)
- China (5)
- Chinese Taipei (6)
- Hong Kong (5)
- Indonesia (6)
- Iran (1)
- Japan (5)
- Kazakhstan (3)
- Kuwait (3)
- Macau (5)
- Malaysia (4)
- Mongolia (4)
- Nepal (4)
- Palestine (2)
- Philippines (6)
- Qatar (1)
- South Korea (5)
- Sri Lanka (1)
- Syria (2)
- Thailand (5)
- United Arab Emirates (2)
- Uzbekistan (4)
