= Triathlon at the 2022 Asian Games – Men's individual =

Men's individual at the 2022 Asian Games
- Venue: Chun'an Jieshou Sports Centre
- Date: 29 September 2023
- Competitors: 29 from 17 nations

Medalists
gold medal	Kenji Nener	Japan
silver medal	Makoto Odakura	Japan
bronze medal	Ayan Beisenbayev	Kazakhstan

The men's triathlon at the 2022 Asian Games was held on 29 September 2023. The race was held over the "international distance" and consisted of 1,500 metres (0.93 mi) swimming, 40 kilometres (25 mi) road bicycle racing, and 10 kilometres (6.2 mi) road running.

== Schedule ==
All times are China Standard Time (UTC+08:00)

Date	Time	Event
Friday, 29 September 2023	08:00	Final

== Results ==
Legend

- DNF — Did not finish

Rank	Athlete	Swim 1.5 km	Trans. 1	Bike 40 km	Trans. 2	Run 10 km	Total time
1st place, gold medalist(s)	Kenji Nener (JPN)	18:17	0:30	56:10	0:23	35:34	1:50:54
2nd place, silver medalist(s)	Makoto Odakura (JPN)	18:19	0:33	59:13	0:26	33:18	1:51:49
3rd place, bronze medalist(s)	Ayan Beisenbayev (KAZ)	18:19	0:32	59:14	0:23	33:57	1:52:25
4	Li Mingxu (CHN)	18:21	0:36	59:08	0:22	34:55	1:53:22
5	Jason Ng (HKG)	18:22	0:31	59:13	0:21	35:11	1:53:38
6	Temirlan Temirov (KAZ)	19:10	0:34	1:00:04	0:24	34:56	1:55:08
7	Fan Junjie (CHN)	18:22	0:32	59:11	0:23	38:09	1:56:37
8	Arslon Tursunov (UZB)	20:17	0:32	59:30	0:27	36:45	1:57:31
9	Rashif Amila Yaqin (INA)	19:12	0:37	1:00:05	0:32	37:47	1:58:13
10	Fernando Casares (PHI)	21:20	0:34	1:00:33	0:24	38:02	2:00:53
11	Wong Chin Wa (MAC)	20:17	0:36	59:36	0:28	40:24	2:01:21
12	Chao Man Kit (MAC)	20:16	0:37	56:34	0:29	42:31	2:03:27
13	Andrew Kim Remolino (PHI)	21:20	0:35	1:00:31	0:30	41:51	2:04:47
14	Temirlan Abdrakhimov (KGZ)	21:17	0:36	1:00:34	0:29	43:44	2:06:40
15	Saud Al-Zaabi (UAE)	27:25	0:40	59:28	0:33	39:46	2:07:52
16	Abdallah Abushabab (PLE)	19:59	0:42	1:01:46	0:26	46:01	2:08:54
17	Abdulaziz Al-Duaij (KUW)	24:20	0:42	1:06:41	0:33	47:26	2:19:42
—	Ganbaataryn Amarsanaa (MGL)	22:58	0:43	1:03:54	0:37		DNF
—	Kim Ji-hwan (KOR)	18:23	0:34	59:09	0:24		DNF
—	Mohammed Al-Ghafri (UAE)	26:00	1:11	1:00:20			DNF
—	Omar Abushabab (PLE)	20:20	0:37				DNF
—	Moulik Maharjan (NEP)	24:20	0:39				Lapped
—	Tsedendambyn Tserenbat (MGL)	30:29	0:55				Lapped
—	Salman Al-Farsi (QAT)	24:46	0:49				DNF
—	Kim Wan-hyuk (KOR)	19:14	0:34				DNF
—	Jeerapat Phokham (THA)	24:24	0:47				DNF
—	Aleksandr Kurishov (UZB)	18:22	0:34				DNF
—	Tamim Al-Kuwari (QAT)	27:11	0:45				DNF
—	Oscar Coggins (HKG)	19:17					DNF
