= Triathlon at the 2022 Asian Games – Mixed relay =

Mixed relay at the 2022 Asian Games
- Venue: Chun'an Jieshou Sports Centre
- Date: 2 October 2023
- Competitors: 48 from 12 nations

Medalists
| gold medal | Japan; Kenji Nener, Yuko Takahashi, Takumi Hojo, Yuka Sato |
| silver medal | China; Li Mingxu, Lin Xinyu, Fan Junjie, Huang Anqi |
| bronze medal | Hong Kong; Wong Tsz To, Bailee Brown, Jason Ng, Charlotte Hall |

The mixed relay triathlon was part of the Triathlon at the 2022 Asian Games program, was held in Chun'an Jieshou Sports Centre Triathlon Course on 2 October 2023. The race was held in four legs each one consisted of 300 metres (0.19 mi) swimming, 6.7 kilometres (4.2 mi) road bicycle racing, and 1.86 kilometres (1.16 mi) road running.

Japanese team managed to claim the gold medal in this event after clocked a total time of 1:26:21. China and Hong Kong finished in the second and third position won the silver and bronze medal respectively.

== Schedule ==
All times are China Standard Time (UTC+08:00)

| Date | Time | Event |
|---|---|---|
| Monday, 2 October 2023 | 08:00 | Final |

== Results ==
| Rank | Team | Swim 300 m | Trans. 1 | Bike 6.7 km | Trans. 2 | Run 1.86 km | Total time |
|---|---|---|---|---|---|---|---|
| 1st place, gold medalist(s) | Japan (JPN) | | | | | | 1:26:21 |
| | Kenji Nener | 3:31 | 0:58 | 9:17 | 0:23 | 5:54 | 19:53 |
| | Yuko Takahashi | 4:11 | 1:06 | 10:23 | 0:24 | 6:23 | 22:27 |
| | Takumi Hojo | 3:45 | 1:03 | 9:35 | 0:24 | 5:46 | 20:33 |
| | Yuka Sato | 4:19 | 1:08 | 10:40 | 0:30 | 6:51 | 23:28 |
| 2nd place, silver medalist(s) | China (CHN) | | | | | | 1:27:48 |
| | Li Mingxu | 3:36 | 1:00 | 10:08 | 0:23 | 5:42 | 20:49 |
| | Lin Xinyu | 4:16 | 1:03 | 10:13 | 0:24 | 6:15 | 22:11 |
| | Fan Junjie | 3:57 | 0:57 | 9:53 | 0:25 | 6:16 | 21:28 |
| | Huang Anqi | 4:29 | 1:03 | 10:40 | 0:25 | 6:43 | 23:20 |
| 3rd place, bronze medalist(s) | Hong Kong (HKG) | | | | | | 1:28:22 |
| | Wong Tsz To | 3:34 | 0:59 | 10:12 | 0:23 | 5:41 | 20:49 |
| | Bailee Brown | 4:16 | 1:04 | 10:11 | 0:24 | 6:31 | 22:26 |
| | Jason Ng | 4:03 | 0:55 | 9:34 | 0:24 | 5:56 | 20:52 |
| | Charlotte Hall | 4:40 | 1:08 | 10:45 | 0:28 | 7:14 | 24:15 |
| 4 | South Korea (KOR) | | | | | | 1:28:29 |
| | Kim Ji-hwan | 3:33 | 0:58 | 9:16 | 0:24 | 6:05 | 20:16 |
| | Jeong Hye-rim | 4:22 | 1:06 | 10:36 | 0:25 | 6:31 | 23:00 |
| | Kim Wan-hyuk | 4:02 | 0:59 | 9:29 | 0:24 | 6:07 | 21:01 |
| | Kim Gyu-ri | 4:45 | 1:10 | 10:51 | 0:24 | 7:02 | 24:12 |
| 5 | Uzbekistan (UZB) | | | | | | 1:28:57 |
| | Aleksandr Kurishov | 3:30 | 0:57 | 9:20 | 0:23 | 6:02 | 20:12 |
| | Irina Juldybina | 4:33 | 1:00 | 10:36 | 0:26 | 6:51 | 23:26 |
| | Arslon Tursunov | 4:08 | 1:00 | 9:39 | 0:27 | 6:08 | 21:22 |
| | Alina Khakimova | 4:48 | 1:07 | 10:29 | 0:26 | 7:07 | 23:57 |
| 6 | Kazakhstan (KAZ) | | | | | | 1:31:13 |
| | Meirlan Iskakov | 3:37 | 0:57 | 10:11 | 0:25 | 5:46 | 20:56 |
| | Ekaterina Shabalina | 4:31 | 1:04 | 11:13 | 0:26 | 6:48 | 24:02 |
| | Ayan Beisenbayev | 4:03 | 0:58 | 10:02 | 0:25 | 5:45 | 21:13 |
| | Arina Shulgina | 4:53 | 1:11 | 11:16 | 0:29 | 7:13 | 25:02 |
| 7 | Philippines (PHI) | | | | | | 1:33:59 |
| | Matthew Hermosa | 3:53 | 0:58 | 10:16 | 0:34 | 6:31 | 22:12 |
| | Raven Alcoseba | 4:34 | 1:04 | 11:13 | 0:27 | 7:19 | 24:37 |
| | Fernando Casares | 4:27 | 1:01 | 10:23 | 0:25 | 5:53 | 22:09 |
| | Kim Mangrobang | 4:51 | 1:06 | 11:33 | 0:29 | 7:02 | 25:01 |
| 8 | Macau (MAC) | | | | | | 1:35:24 |
| | Wong Chin Wa | 3:56 | 0:58 | 10:13 | 0:26 | 6:28 | 22:01 |
| | Cheng Wan U | 4:51 | 0:39 | 11:55 | 0:35 | 7:57 | 25:57 |
| | Chao Man Kit | 4:10 | 1:06 | 10:27 | 0:28 | 6:55 | 23:06 |
| | Hoi Long | 4:38 | 1:06 | 10:45 | 0:27 | 7:24 | 24:20 |
| 9 | Singapore (SGP) | | | | | | 1:35:38 |
| | Bryce Chong | 3:44 | 1:10 | 10:13 | 0:27 | 6:49 | 22:23 |
| | Herlene Yu | 4:23 | 1:10 | 11:24 | 0:27 | 7:39 | 25:03 |
| | Luke Chua | 4:19 | 1:06 | 10:44 | 0:25 | 6:40 | 23:14 |
| | Louisa Middleditch | 5:10 | 1:10 | 11:21 | 0:26 | 6:51 | 24:58 |
| 10 | Thailand (THA) | | | | | | 1:44:48 |
| | Narawich Vierra | 4:00 | 1:05 | 11:42 | 0:27 | 7:22 | 24:36 |
| | Kotchaporn Urapa | 5:49 | 1:19 | 12:18 | 0:30 | 8:23 | 28:19 |
| | Thamakorn Plengplang | 4:35 | 1:11 | 11:44 | 0:27 | 7:34 | 25:31 |
| | Aisika Kaewyongkod | 4:52 | 1:17 | 12:12 | 0:30 | 7:31 | 26:22 |
| 11 | Nepal (NEP) | | | | | | 1:48:40 |
| | Moulik Maharjan | 4:31 | 1:11 | 11:50 | 0:26 | 7:45 | 25:43 |
| | Yuska Maharjan | 5:16 | 0:38 | 14:24 | 0:34 | 10:44 | 31:36 |
| | Basant Tharu | 5:33 | 1:02 | 11:06 | 0:27 | 3:56 | 22:04 |
| | Shrebi Maharjan | 7:37 | 1:07 | 12:09 | 0:29 | 7:55 | 29:17 |
| 12 | Mongolia (MGL) | | | | | | 2:12:34 |
| | Ganbaataryn Amarsanaa | 4:04 | 1:12 | 10:45 | 0:34 | 6:50 | 23:25 |
| | Ganboldyn Gantsetseg | 5:52 | 1:59 | 16:15 | 0:35 | 12:07 | 36:48 |
| | Chuluunsükhiin Gansükh | 5:27 | 1:25 | 12:30 | 0:32 | 10:22 | 30:16 |
| | Oidovmönkhiin Erdenezul | 6:58 | 1:51 | 18:15 | 0:52 | 14:09 | 42:05 |
