= Triathlon at the 2018 Asian Games – Men's individual =

Men's individual at the 2018 Asian Games
- Venue: Jakabaring Sport City
- Date: 1 September 2018
- Competitors: 34 from 21 nations

Medalists
gold medal	Jumpei Furuya	Japan
silver medal	Ayan Beisenbayev	Kazakhstan
bronze medal	Li Mingxu	China

The men's triathlon was part of the Triathlon at the 2018 Asian Games program, was held in JSC Lake Jakabaring on 1 September 2018. The race was held over the "international distance" and consisted of 1,500 metres (0.93 mi) swimming, 40 kilometres (25 mi) road bicycle racing, and 10 kilometres (6.2 mi) road running.

Jumpei Furuya of Japan won the gold medal after finished in a time of 1 hour 49 minutes 43 seconds. The silver and bronze medals were earned by Ayan Beisenbayev from Kazakhstan and Li Mingxu from China respectively.

== Schedule ==
All times are Western Indonesia Time (UTC+07:00)

Date	Time	Event
Saturday, 1 September 2018	07:30	Final

== Results ==
Legend

- DNF — Did not finish
- DSQ — Disqualified

Rank	Athlete	Swim 1.5 km	Trans. 1	Bike 40 km	Trans. 2	Run 10 km	Total time
1st place, gold medalist(s)	Jumpei Furuya (JPN)	18:48	0:26	56:36	0:20	33:33	1:49:43
2nd place, silver medalist(s)	Ayan Beisenbayev (KAZ)	18:55	0:27	56:29	0:22	34:25	1:50:38
3rd place, bronze medalist(s)	Li Mingxu (CHN)	18:51	0:26	56:35	0:21	34:36	1:50:49
4	Jiang Zhihang (CHN)	18:51	0:25	56:35	0:24	34:38	1:50:53
5	Chang Tuan-chun (TPE)	19:53	0:28	56:50	0:23	33:44	1:51:18
6	Mohamad Maso (SYR)	19:56	0:27	56:46	0:25	35:40	1:53:14
7	Makoto Odakura (JPN)	18:47	0:27	56:38	0:23	37:19	1:53:34
8	Wong Hui Wai (HKG)	18:52	0:24	56:36	0:20	37:40	1:53:52
9	Heo Min-ho (KOR)	20:02	0:28	56:42	0:24	36:45	1:54:21
10	John Chicano (PHI)	21:39	0:30	56:10	0:27	35:47	1:54:33
11	Maxim Kriat (KAZ)	21:39	0:27	56:14	0:29	36:04	1:54:53
12	Wang Wei-kai (TPE)	20:07	0:28	56:39	0:24	37:42	1:55:20
13	Aleksandr Kurishov (UZB)	18:50	0:28	57:56	0:20	37:56	1:55:30
14	Behzad Nobaripour (IRI)	21:03	0:32	56:38	0:25	37:54	1:55:32
15	Muhammad Ahlul Firman (INA)	20:10	0:27	56:36	0:26	38:23	1:56:02
16	Nikko Huelgas (PHI)	21:37	0:29	56:15	0:24	39:54	1:58:39
17	Abdallah Abushabab (PLE)	19:56	0:27	56:50	0:27	41:42	1:59:22
18	Omar Abushabab (PLE)	21:33	0:28	56:20	0:23	43:11	2:01:55
19	Wong Chin Wa (MAC)	21:37	0:28	1:01:53	0:20	37:53	2:02:11
20	Chao Man Kit (MAC)	20:14	0:28	57:41	0:24	44:05	2:02:52
21	Ryan Tan (MAS)	21:35	0:30	1:01:52	0:24	39:59	2:04:20
22	Omar Ali (BRN)	21:55	0:31	1:03:07	0:30	39:25	2:05:28
23	Aldrian Yeo (MAS)	21:35	0:28	1:01:54	0:25	41:09	2:05:31
24	Lakruwan Dewa (SRI)	24:55	0:31	1:03:06	0:31	42:25	2:11:28
25	Ahmad Al-Sarhan (KUW)	28:36	0:35	1:01:56	0:22	41:14	2:12:43
26	Ebrahim Al-Romaihi (QAT)	24:33	0:31	1:04:04	0:27	43:59	2:13:34
27	Sirapob Sudsupap (THA)	23:16	0:29	1:02:43	0:29	47:21	2:14:18
28	Ahmad Al-Fahim (UAE)	27:39	0:36	1:02:57	0:36	48:14	2:20:02
—	Mohammad Al-Sabbagh (SYR)	19:02	0:30	57:38	0:23		DNF
—	Kim Ji-hwan (KOR)	18:49	0:26	56:35	0:22		DNF
—	Law Leong Tim (HKG)	19:52	0:28	57:22	0:29		DNF
—	Javohir Yunusov (UZB)	19:55	0:36				DNF
—	Mohsen Al-Ali (UAE)						DSQ
—	Dipesh Chaudhary (NEP)						DSQ
