= Triathlon at the 2018 Asian Games – Women's individual =

Women's individual at the 2018 Asian Games
- Venue: Jakabaring Sport City
- Date: 31 August 2018
- Competitors: 22 from 13 nations

Medalists
gold medal	Yuko Takahashi	Japan
silver medal	Zhong Mengying	China
bronze medal	Hoi Long	Macau

The women's triathlon was part of the Triathlon at the 2018 Asian Games program, was held in JSC Lake Jakabaring on 31 August 2018. The race was held over the "international distance" and consisted of 1,500 metres (0.93 mi) swimming, 40 kilometres (25 mi) road bicycle racing, and 10 kilometres (6.2 mi) road running.

Japanese triathlete Yuko Takahashi clinched the gold medal with a time of 1:59:29. Zhong Mengying from China and Hoi Long from Macau captured the silver and bronze medal respectively.

== Schedule ==
All times are Western Indonesia Time (UTC+07:00)

Date	Time	Event
Friday, 31 August 2018	07:30	Final

== Results ==
Legend

- DNF — Did not finish

Rank	Athlete	Swim 1.5 km	Trans. 1	Bike 40 km	Trans. 2	Run 10 km	Total time
1st place, gold medalist(s)	Yuko Takahashi (JPN)	19:02	0:29	1:00:33	0:24	39:01	1:59:29
2nd place, silver medalist(s)	Zhong Mengying (CHN)	19:14	0:27	1:03:10	0:21	38:04	2:01:15
3rd place, bronze medalist(s)	Hoi Long (MAC)	20:08	0:29	1:02:13	0:25	38:13	2:01:28
4	Zhang Yi (CHN)	20:20	0:28	1:02:06	0:20	39:00	2:02:14
5	Jang Yun-jung (KOR)	19:17	0:27	1:03:09	0:19	39:23	2:02:25
6	Hilda Choi (HKG)	21:17	0:28	1:01:04	0:24	41:18	2:04:31
7	Kim Mangrobang (PHI)	20:18	0:28	1:02:06	0:24	42:04	2:05:20
8	Kuo Jia-chi (TPE)	20:21	0:28	1:02:01	0:25	42:28	2:05:43
9	Kim Kilgroe (PHI)	21:44	0:27	1:00:37	0:23	43:46	2:06:57
10	Chang Chi-wen (TPE)	20:20	0:27	1:02:07	0:30	45:19	2:08:43
11	Anastassiya Avtushko (KAZ)	23:45	0:33	1:09:58	0:28	46:07	2:20:51
12	Irene Chong (MAS)	21:49	0:30	1:07:23	0:30	50:47	2:20:59
13	Sameera Al-Bitar (BRN)	21:11	0:33	1:08:04	0:25	51:35	2:21:48
14	Lei Cho Ieng (MAC)	25:03	0:31	1:08:44	0:44	52:03	2:27:05
15	Najlaa Al-Jerewi (KUW)	25:15	0:46	1:08:14	0:39	52:42	2:27:36
16	Teoh Sue Ling (MAS)	25:04	0:41	1:09:58	0:43	53:01	2:29:27
17	Sayaka Cakravastia (INA)	27:36	0:34	1:13:57	0:26	56:21	2:38:54
18	Fatemah Al-Ghanim (KUW)	30:26	0:34	1:14:48	0:36	56:11	2:42:35
—	Yuka Sato (JPN)	19:13	0:28	1:03:09	0:23		DNF
—	Jeong Hye-rim (KOR)	20:17	0:26	1:02:08	0:22		DNF
—	Bailee Brown (HKG)	21:15	0:25	1:01:14	0:25		DNF
—	Alina Khakimova (UZB)	24:20	0:29				DNF
