= Triathlon at the 2022 Asian Games =

- Venue: Chun'an Jieshou Sports Centre
- Dates: 29 September – 2 October 2023
- Competitors: 70 from 20 nations

Triathlon at the 2022 Asian Games was held at the Chun'an Jieshou Sports Centre Triathlon Course, Hangzhou, China, from 29 September to 2 October 2023. Both men and women competed in individual events, plus a mixed-gendered relay event.

The individual triathlon contained three components: a 1.5 km swim, 40 km cycle, and a 10 km run. The relay event featured teams of four competitors, where each completed a 300 m swim, a 6.7 km cycle, and a 1.86 km run.

== Schedule ==
F	Final

Event↓/Date →	29th Fri	30th Sat	1st Sun	2nd Mon
Men's individual	F			
Women's individual		F		
Mixed relay				F

== Medalists ==
Event	Gold	Silver	Bronze
Men's individual	Kenji Nener; Japan	Makoto Odakura; Japan	Ayan Beisenbayev; Kazakhstan
Women's individual	Yuko Takahashi; Japan	Lin Xinyu; China	Yang Yifan; China
Mixed relay	Japan; Kenji Nener; Yuko Takahashi; Takumi Hojo; Yuka Sato	China; Li Mingxu; Lin Xinyu; Fan Junjie; Huang Anqi	Hong Kong; Wong Tsz To; Bailee Brown; Jason Ng; Charlotte Hall

== Medal table ==
Rank	Nation	Gold	Silver	Bronze	Total
1	Japan (JPN)	3	1	0	4
2	China (CHN)	0	2	1	3
3	Hong Kong (HKG)	0	0	1	1
3	Kazakhstan (KAZ)	0	0	1	1
Totals (4 entries)		3	3	3	9

== Participating nations ==
A total of 70 athletes from 20 nations competed in triathlon at the 2022 Asian Games:

- Cambodia (1)
- China (5)
- Hong Kong (5)
- Indonesia (1)
- Japan (5)
- Jordan (2)
- Kazakhstan (5)
- Kuwait (2)
- Kyrgyzstan (1)
- Macau (4)
- Mongolia (5)
- Nepal (4)
- Palestine (2)
- Philippines (5)
- Qatar (2)
- Singapore (4)
- South Korea (5)
- Thailand (5)
- United Arab Emirates (3)
- Uzbekistan (4)
