= Swimming at the 2018 Asian Games – Women's 200 metre freestyle =

Women's 200 metre freestyle at the 2018 Asian Games
- Venue: Gelora Bung Karno Aquatic Stadium
- Date: 22 August 2018
- Competitors: 24 from 16 nations

Medalists
gold medal	Li Bingjie	China
silver medal	Yang Junxuan	China
bronze medal	Chihiro Igarashi	Japan

The women's 200 metre freestyle event at the 2018 Asian Games took place on 22 August at the Gelora Bung Karno Aquatic Stadium.

== Schedule ==
All times are Western Indonesia Time (UTC+07:00)

Date	Time	Event
Wednesday, 22 August 2018	09:13	Heats
Wednesday, 22 August 2018	18:06	Final

== Records ==
Prior to this competition, the existing world, Asian and Games records were as follows.

World Record	Federica Pellegrini (ITA)	1:52.98	Rome, Italy	29 July 2009
Asian Record	Rikako Ikee (JPN)	1:54.85	Tokyo, Japan	9 August 2018
Games Record	Zhu Qianwei (CHN)	1:56.65	Guangzhou, China	13 November 2010

== Results ==
=== Heats ===
Rank	Heat	Athlete	Time	Notes
1	1	Chihiro Igarashi (JPN)	2:00.21	
2	3	Yang Junxuan (CHN)	2:01.30	
3	2	Li Bingjie (CHN)	2:01.43	
4	1	Camille Cheng (HKG)	2:01.68	
5	3	Yui Ohashi (JPN)	2:02.41	
6	3	Natthanan Junkrajang (THA)	2:02.49	
7	3	Jasmine Al-Khaldi (PHI)	2:02.53	
8	3	Kornkarnjana Sapianchai (THA)	2:02.55	
9	2	Kim Jin-ha (KOR)	2:03.11	
10	2	Christie Chue (SGP)	2:03.78	
11	2	Tinky Ho (HKG)	2:04.05	
12	1	Ressa Kania Dewi (INA)	2:04.78	
13	1	Choi Jung-min (KOR)	2:04.90	
14	1	Sagita Putri Krisdewanti (INA)	2:06.75	
15	1	Elizaveta Rogozhnikova (KGZ)	2:07.92	
16	2	Cherlyn Yeoh (SGP)	2:07.96	
17	3	Mai Thị Linh (VIE)	2:08.85	
18	2	Gabriella Doueihy (LBN)	2:09.84	
19	1	Gaurika Singh (NEP)	2:12.53	
20	3	Choi Weng Tong (MAC)	2:16.32	
21	2	Long Chi Wai (MAC)	2:19.04	
22	3	Miraal Zahra Haque (PAK)	2:29.07	
23	1	Altanshagain Kherlen (MGL)	2:33.53	
24	2	Imelda Ximenes Belo (TLS)	2:56.50	

=== Final ===
Rank	Athlete	Time	Notes
1st place, gold medalist(s)	Li Bingjie (CHN)	1:56.74	
2nd place, silver medalist(s)	Yang Junxuan (CHN)	1:57.48	
3rd place, bronze medalist(s)	Chihiro Igarashi (JPN)	1:57.49	
4	Yui Ohashi (JPN)	2:00.29	
5	Natthanan Junkrajang (THA)	2:01.67	
6	Camille Cheng (HKG)	2:01.95	
7	Kornkarnjana Sapianchai (THA)	2:01.96	
8	Jasmine Al-Khaldi (PHI)	2:03.24	
