= Badminton at the 2018 Asian Games – Mixed doubles =

Mixed doubles at the 2018 Asian Games
- Venue: Istora Gelora Bung Karno
- Dates: 23–27 August
- Competitors: 52 from 15 nations

Medalists
gold medal	Zheng Siwei; Huang Yaqiong	China
silver medal	Tang Chun Man; Tse Ying Suet	Hong Kong
bronze medal	Tontowi Ahmad; Liliyana Natsir	Indonesia
bronze medal	Wang Yilü; Huang Dongping	China

The badminton mixed doubles tournament at the 2018 Asian Games in Jakarta took place from 23 to 27 August at Istora Gelora Bung Karno.

== Schedule ==
All times are Western Indonesia Time (UTC+07:00)

Date	Time	Event
Thursday, 23 August 2018	12:00	Round of 32
Friday, 24 August 2018	13:00	Round of 16
Saturday, 25 August 2018	13:00	Quarterfinals
Sunday, 26 August 2018	17:30	Semifinals
Monday, 27 August 2018	19:30	Gold medal match

== Seeds ==
The top four Asian pairs were seeded based on the BWF World Rankings.

1. Zheng Siwei / Huang Yaqiong (CHN) (champions)
2. Wang Yilü / Huang Dongping (CHN) (semi-finals)
3. Tontowi Ahmad / Liliyana Natsir (INA) (semi-finals)
4. Tang Chun Man / Tse Ying Suet (HKG) (final)

=== Top half ===
Round of 32
Nipitphon Phuangphuapet (THA); Puttita Supajirakul (THA)	17	20
Lee Yang (TPE); Hsu Ya-ching (TPE)	21	22
Sachin Dias (SRI); Thilini Hendahewa (SRI)	21	12	13
Đỗ Tuấn Đức (VIE); Phạm Như Thảo (VIE)	13	21	21
Ahmed Thoif Mohamed (MDV); Fathimath Nabaaha Abdul Razzaq (MDV)	2	6
Seo Seung-jae (KOR); Chae Yoo-jung (KOR)	21	21
Chan Peng Soon (MAS); Goh Liu Ying (MAS)	21	23
Pranav Chopra (IND); N. Sikki Reddy (IND)	15	21
Dipesh Dhami (NEP); Jessica Gurung (NEP)	11	11
Lee Chun Hei (HKG); Chau Hoi Wah (HKG)	21	21

Round of 16
1	Zheng Siwei (CHN); Huang Yaqiong (CHN)	21	21
Lee Yang (TPE); Hsu Ya-ching (TPE)	19	16
Takuro Hoki (JPN); Koharu Yonemoto (JPN)	21	21
Đỗ Tuấn Đức (VIE); Phạm Như Thảo (VIE)	12	13
3	Tontowi Ahmad (INA); Liliyana Natsir (INA)	22	21
Seo Seung-jae (KOR); Chae Yoo-jung (KOR)	20	17
Chan Peng Soon (MAS); Goh Liu Ying (MAS)	17	21	26
Lee Chun Hei (HKG); Chau Hoi Wah (HKG)	21	19	28

Quarterfinals
1	Zheng Siwei (CHN); Huang Yaqiong (CHN)	21	21
Takuro Hoki (JPN); Koharu Yonemoto (JPN)	13	15
3	Tontowi Ahmad (INA); Liliyana Natsir (INA)	21	17	21
Lee Chun Hei (HKG); Chau Hoi Wah (HKG)	15	21	16

Semifinals
1	Zheng Siwei (CHN); Huang Yaqiong (CHN)	21	21
3	Tontowi Ahmad (INA); Liliyana Natsir (INA)	13	18

=== Bottom half ===
Round of 32
Satwiksairaj Rankireddy (IND); Ashwini Ponnappa (IND)	25	16
Dechapol Puavaranukroh (THA); Sapsiree Taerattanachai (THA)	27	21
Ratnajit Tamang (NEP); Nangsal Tamang (NEP)	13	7
Ricky Karanda Suwardi (INA); Debby Susanto (INA)	21	21
Wang Chi-lin (TPE); Lee Chia-hsin (TPE)	12	16
Goh Soon Huat (MAS); Shevon Jemie Lai (MAS)	21	21
Choi Sol-gyu (KOR); Shin Seung-chan (KOR)	21	20	15
Yuta Watanabe (JPN); Arisa Higashino (JPN)	12	22	21
Che Pui Ngai (MAC); Gong Xue Xin (MAC)	21	21
Sarim Mohamed (MDV); Aminath Shahurunaaz Moosa (MDV)	8	8

Round of 16
Dechapol Puavaranukroh (THA); Sapsiree Taerattanachai (THA)	20	21	21
Ricky Karanda Suwardi (INA); Debby Susanto (INA)	22	18	13
Goh Soon Huat (MAS); Shevon Jemie Lai (MAS)	21	11	20
4	Tang Chun Man (HKG); Tse Ying Suet (HKG)	14	21	22
Yuta Watanabe (JPN); Arisa Higashino (JPN)	21	21
Rizwan Azam (PAK); Saima Waqas (PAK)	7	9
Che Pui Ngai (MAC); Gong Xue Xin (MAC)	7	8
2	Wang Yilü (CHN); Huang Dongping (CHN)	21	21

Quarterfinals
Dechapol Puavaranukroh (THA); Sapsiree Taerattanachai (THA)	13	20
4	Tang Chun Man (HKG); Tse Ying Suet (HKG)	21	22
Yuta Watanabe (JPN); Arisa Higashino (JPN)	17	21	17
2	Wang Yilü (CHN); Huang Dongping (CHN)	21	18	21

Semifinals
4	Tang Chun Man (HKG); Tse Ying Suet (HKG)	22	19	23
2	Wang Yilü (CHN); Huang Dongping (CHN)	20	21	21

== Results ==
=== Final ===
Gold medal match
1	Zheng Siwei (CHN); Huang Yaqiong (CHN)	21	21
4	Tang Chun Man (HKG); Tse Ying Suet (HKG)	8	15
