= Kenji Nener =

Japanese triathlete (born 1993)

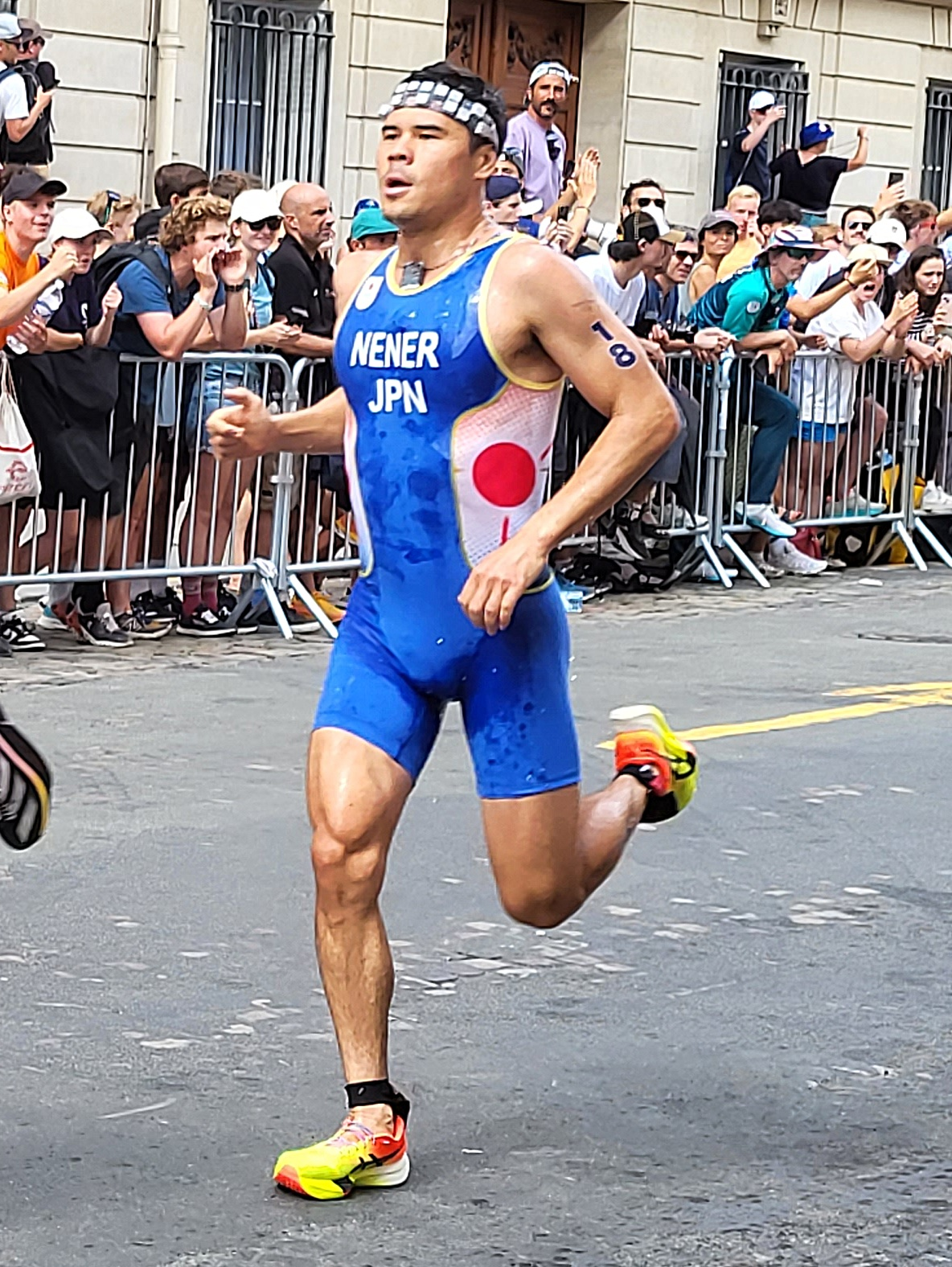
- Nener competing in the 2024 Summer Olympics

Personal information
- Nationality: Japanese
- Born: 26 May 1993 (age 33) Perth, Australia

Sport
- Sport: Triathlon
Medal record
Representing Japan
Men's triathlon
Asian Games
Gold medal – first place	2022 Hangzhou	Individual
Gold medal – first place	2022 Hangzhou	Mixed relay
Super League Triathlon
Bronze medal – third place	2022 Toulouse	Triple Mix

Kenji Nener (ニナー 賢治, born 26 May 1993) is a Japanese triathlete. He competed in the men's event at the 2020 Summer Olympics held in Tokyo, Japan, finishing 14th. He also competed in the mixed relay event. Nener was born in Australia to an Australian father and a Japanese mother. He initially represented his country of birth, but switched allegiances when he was granted Japanese citizenship in 2021. Nener also competes in Super League Triathlon races. Nener's biggest success in Super League racing came in 2022, when he finished 3rd at SLT Toulouse, Super League's first ever event in France.

He placed 15th in the individual event at the 2024 Summer Olympics.
