= Jumpei Furuya =

Japanese triathlete (born 1991)

Personal information
- Born: 18 May 1991 (age 35)

Sport
- Country: Japan
- Sport: Triathlon
Medal record
Men's triathlon
Representing Japan
Asian Games
Gold medal – first place	2018 Jakarta	Individual
Gold medal – first place	2018 Jakarta	Mixed relay

Jumpei Furuya (古谷純平, Furuya Jumpei; born 18 May 1991) is a Japanese triathlete. He won the gold medal in the men's triathlon at the 2018 Asian Games in Jakarta, Indonesia.

He also won the gold medal in the mixed relay event.
