= Yuko Takahashi =

Japanese triathlete (born 1991)

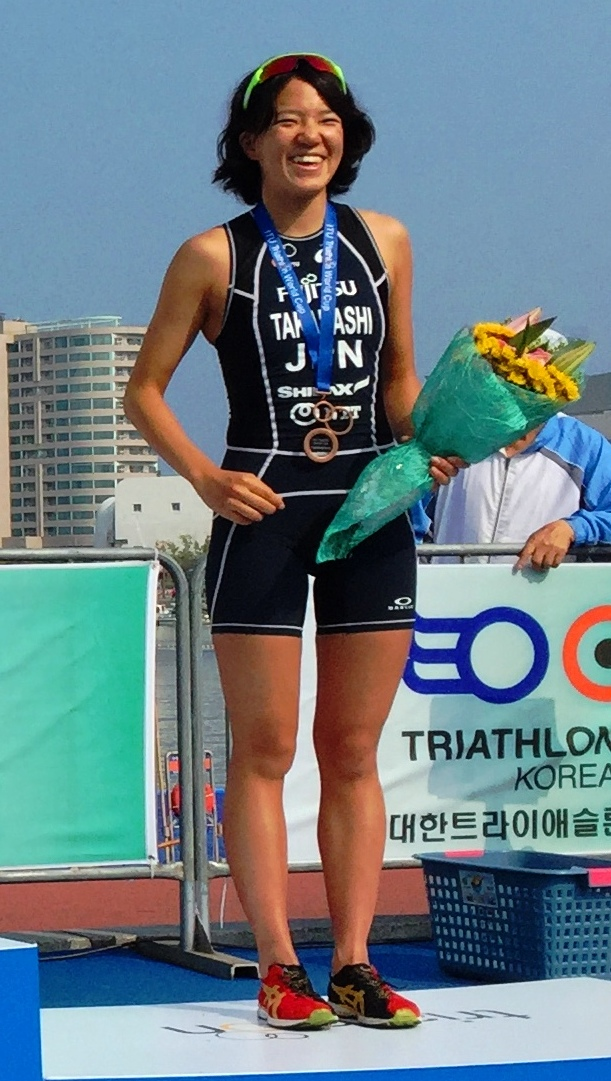
- Yuko Takahashi in 2015

Personal information
- Born: 27 August 1991 (age 35) Mitaka, Japan

Sport
- Country: Japan
- Sport: Triathlon
Medal record
Women's triathlon
Representing Japan
Asian Games
| Gold medal – first place | 2018 Jakarta | Individual |
| Gold medal – first place | 2018 Jakarta | Mixed relay |
| Gold medal – first place | 2022 Hangzhou | Individual |
| Gold medal – first place | 2022 Hangzhou | Mixed relay |
Asian Championships
| Gold medal – first place | 2025 Istanbul | Individual |
Asian Sprint Championships
| Silver medal – second place | 2025 Hong Kong | Mixed relay |
| Bronze medal – third place | 2025 Hong Kong | Individual |

Yuko Takahashi (高橋 侑子, Takahashi Yūko; born 27 August 1991) is a Japanese triathlete. She won the gold medal in the women's triathlon at the 2018 Asian Games in Jakarta, Indonesia.

She also won the gold medal in the mixed relay event.

In 2021, she competed in the women's event at the 2020 Summer Olympics in Tokyo, Japan. She also competed in the mixed relay event. In 2024, she competed in the women's triathlon at the Summer Olympics in Paris, France.
