= Tang Chun Man =

Hong Kong badminton player (born 1995)

Jordan Tang Chun Man 鄧俊文
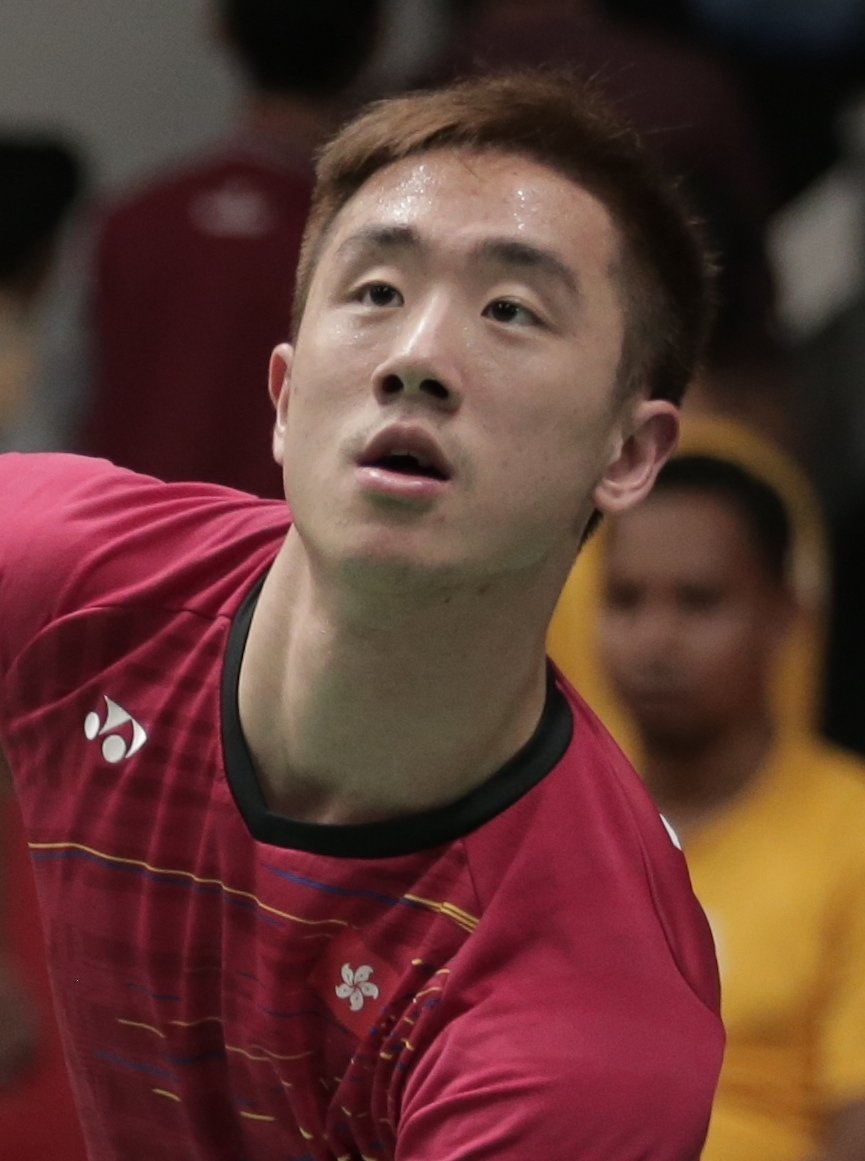
- Tang at the 2018 Indonesia Masters

Personal information
- Born: 20 March 1995 (age 31) Hong Kong
- Height: 1.78 m (5 ft 10 in)
- Weight: 74 kg (163 lb)

Sport
- Country: Hong Kong
- Sport: Badminton
- Handedness: Left
- Coached by: Jeremy Gan

Men's & mixed doubles
- Highest ranking: 24 (MD with Or Chin Chung, 25 May 2017); 2 (XD with Tse Ying Suet, 28 June 2018)
- Current ranking: 15 (XD with Tse Ying Suet, 10 November 2026)
- BWF profile
Medal record
Men's badminton
Representing Hong Kong
World Championships
Bronze medal – third place	2018 Nanjing	Mixed doubles
Bronze medal – third place	2021 Huelva	Mixed doubles
Asian Games
Silver medal – second place	2018 Jakarta–Palembang	Mixed doubles
Asia Championships
Gold medal – first place	2025 Ningbo	Mixed doubles
Asia Mixed Team Championships
Bronze medal – third place	2019 Hong Kong	Mixed team

Tang Chun Man
- Traditional Chinese: 鄧俊文
- Simplified Chinese: 邓俊文
Transcriptions
Standard Mandarin
- Hanyu Pinyin: Dèng Jùnwén
Yue: Cantonese
- Jyutping: Dang6 Zeon3 Man4

Jordan Tang Chun Man (Chinese: 鄧俊文; Jyutping: dang6 zeon3 man4, born 20 March 1995) is a Hong Kong badminton player. He started playing badminton at the age of seven, and joined the national team when he was 18. He was a 2025 Asian Championships gold medalist, 2018 Asian Games silver medalist, and two-time bronze medalists in the World Championships. He won his first title in the 2016 Chinese Taipei Masters partnering with Tse Ying Suet.

== Early life ==
Tang studied at NTWJWA Leung Sing Tak Primary School and Diocesan Boys' School. Originally a football fan, he switched to badminton at age seven.

== Career ==
Tang competed at the 2020 Summer Olympics in the mixed doubles partnering with Tse Ying Suet. They advanced to the bronze medal match, but were defeated by the host pair Yuta Watanabe and Arisa Higashino in straight games.

In the 2024 Summer Olympics mixed doubles event, Tang and Tse advanced to the quarterfinals but were defeated by Chae Yoo-jung and Seo Seung-jae.

In April 2025, Tang and Tse won the mixed doubled title in the Asian Championships by overcoming home favorites Jiang Zhenbang and Wei Yaxin in the semi-final, which was their first victory over the world number 1 pair.

== Achievements ==
=== BWF World Championships ===
Mixed doubles
Year	Venue	Partner	Opponent	Score	Result
2018	Nanjing Youth Olympic Sports Park, Nanjing, China	(Hong Kong) Tse Ying Suet	(China) Wang Yilyu (China) Huang Dongping	6–21, 10–21	Bronze
2021	Palacio de los Deportes Carolina Marín, Huelva, Spain	(Hong Kong) Tse Ying Suet	(Thailand) Dechapol Puavaranukroh (Thailand) Sapsiree Taerattanachai	21–15, 7–21, 10–21	Bronze

=== Asian Games ===
Mixed doubles
Year	Venue	Partner	Opponent	Score	Result
2018	Istora Gelora Bung Karno, Jakarta, Indonesia	(Hong Kong) Tse Ying Suet	(China) Zheng Siwei (China) Huang Yaqiong	8–21, 15–21	Silver

=== Asian Championships ===
Mixed doubles
Year	Venue	Partner	Opponent	Score	Result	Ref.
2025	Ningbo Olympic Sports Center Gymnasium, Ningbo, China	(Hong Kong) Tse Ying Suet	(Japan) Hiroki Midorikawa (Japan) Natsu Saito	21–15, 17–21, 21–13	Gold	

=== BWF World Tour (8 titles, 6 runners-up) ===
The BWF World Tour, which was announced on 19 March 2017 and implemented in 2018, is a series of elite badminton tournaments sanctioned by the Badminton World Federation (BWF). The BWF World Tour is divided into levels of World Tour Finals, Super 1000, Super 750, Super 500, Super 300 (part of the HSBC World Tour), and the BWF Tour Super 100.

Mixed doubles
Year	Tournament	Level	Partner	Opponent	Score	Result
2018	Malaysia Masters	Super 500	(Hong Kong) Tse Ying Suet	(China) Zheng Siwei (China) Huang Yaqiong	19–21, 22–20, 21–18	(gold) Winner
2018	Macau Open	Super 300	(Hong Kong) Tse Ying Suet	(Hong Kong) Lee Chun Hei (Hong Kong) Chau Hoi Wah	21–14, 21–15	(gold) Winner
2019	Lingshui China Masters	Super 100	(Hong Kong) Ng Tsz Yau	(China) Guo Xinwa (China) Liu Xuanxuan	16–21, 21–14, 21–13	(gold) Winner
2019	Chinese Taipei Open	Super 300	(Hong Kong) Tse Ying Suet	(South Korea) Seo Seung-jae (South Korea) Chae Yoo-jung	21–18, 21–10	(gold) Winner
2019	Korea Masters	Super 300	(Hong Kong) Tse Ying Suet	(Malaysia) Goh Soon Huat (Malaysia) Shevon Jemie Lai	21–14, 21–15	(gold) Winner
2021	Indonesia Masters	Super 750	(Hong Kong) Tse Ying Suet	(Thailand) Dechapol Puavaranukroh (Thailand) Sapsiree Taerattanachai	11–21, 12–21	(silver) Runner-up
2023	Hong Kong Open	Super 500	(Hong Kong) Tse Ying Suet	(China) Guo Xinwa (China) Wei Yaxin	13–21, 19–21	(silver) Runner-up
2023	French Open	Super 750	(Hong Kong) Tse Ying Suet	(China) Jiang Zhenbang (China) Wei Yaxin	17–21, 21–15, 12–21	(silver) Runner-up
2023	Hylo Open	Super 300	(Hong Kong) Tse Ying Suet	(Indonesia) Rehan Naufal Kusharjanto (Indonesia) Lisa Ayu Kusumawati	15–21, 21–15, 21–14	(gold) Winner
2024	German Open	Super 300	(Hong Kong) Tse Ying Suet	(South Korea) Kim Won-ho (South Korea) Jeong Na-eun	21–13, 21–19	(gold) Winner
2024	Japan Open	Super 750	(Hong Kong) Tse Ying Suet	(China) Jiang Zhenbang (China) Wei Yaxin	12–21, 12–21	(silver) Runner-up
2025	Ruichang China Masters	Super 100	(Hong Kong) Ng Tsz Yau	(China) Zhang Hanyu (China) Tang Ruizhi	21–17, 18–21, 21–12	(gold) Winner
2025	Singapore Open	Super 750	(Hong Kong) Tse Ying Suet	(Thailand) Dechapol Puavaranukroh (Thailand) Supissara Paewsampran	16–21, 9–21	(silver) Runner-up
2026	Japan Open	Super 750	(Hong Kong) Tse Ying Suet	(China) Feng Yanzhe (China) Huang Dongping	14–21, 21–14, 15–21	(silver) Runner-up

=== BWF Superseries (1 title, 1 runner-up) ===
The BWF Superseries, which was launched on 14 December 2006 and implemented in 2007, was a series of elite badminton tournaments, sanctioned by the Badminton World Federation (BWF). BWF Superseries levels were Superseries and Superseries Premier. A season of Superseries consisted of twelve tournaments around the world that had been introduced since 2011. Successful players were invited to the Superseries Finals, which were held at the end of each year.

Mixed doubles
Year	Tournament	Partner	Opponent	Score	Result
2017	Denmark Open	(Hong Kong) Tse Ying Suet	(China) Zheng Siwei (China) Chen Qingchen	24–22, 19–21, 23–21	(gold) Winner
2017	Dubai World Superseries Finals	(Hong Kong) Tse Ying Suet	(China) Zheng Siwei (China) Chen Qingchen	15–21, 20–22	(silver) Runner-up

BWF Super Series Finals tournament
BWF Super Series Premier tournament
BWF Super Series tournament

=== BWF Grand Prix (1 title, 2 runners-up) ===
The BWF Grand Prix had two levels, the Grand Prix and Grand Prix Gold. It was a series of badminton tournaments sanctioned by the Badminton World Federation (BWF) and played between 2007 and 2017.

Mixed doubles
Year	Tournament	Partner	Opponent	Score	Result
2016	Thailand Open	(Hong Kong) Tse Ying Suet	(Malaysia) Tan Kian Meng (Malaysia) Lai Pei Jing	16–21, 20–22	(silver) Runner-up
2016	Chinese Taipei Masters	(Hong Kong) Tse Ying Suet	(Japan) Ryota Taohata (Japan) Koharu Yonemoto	11–3, 11–7, 14–12	(gold) Winner
2016	Macau Open	(Hong Kong) Tse Ying Suet	(China) Zhang Nan (China) Li Yinhui	19–21, 15–21	(silver) Runner-up

BWF Grand Prix Gold tournament
BWF Grand Prix tournament

=== BWF International Challenge/Series (1 title) ===
Mixed doubles
Year	Tournament	Partner	Opponent	Score	Result
2025	Vietnam International	(Hong Kong) Ng Tsz Yau	(Malaysia) Jimmy Wong (Malaysia) Lai Pei Jing	21–19, 21–19	(gold) Winner

BWF International Challenge tournament
BWF International Series tournament
BWF Future Series tournament

== Honours ==
- Hong Kong Sports Stars Awards for Team Event (together with Tse Ying Suet): 2018, 2019, 2021
