= Zhong Mengying =

Chinese triathlete (born 1990)

Personal information
- Nationality: Chinese
- Born: 14 March 1990 (age 36)

Sport
- Sport: Triathlon
Medal record
Women's triathlon
Representing China
Asian Games
Silver medal – second place	2018 Jakarta	Individual

Zhong Mengying (born 14 March 1990) is a Chinese triathlete. She won the silver medal in the women's triathlon at the 2018 Asian Games in Jakarta, Indonesia. She competed in the women's event at the 2020 Summer Olympics held in Tokyo, Japan, settling for 35th place.
