= Makoto Odakura =

Japanese triathlete (born 1993)

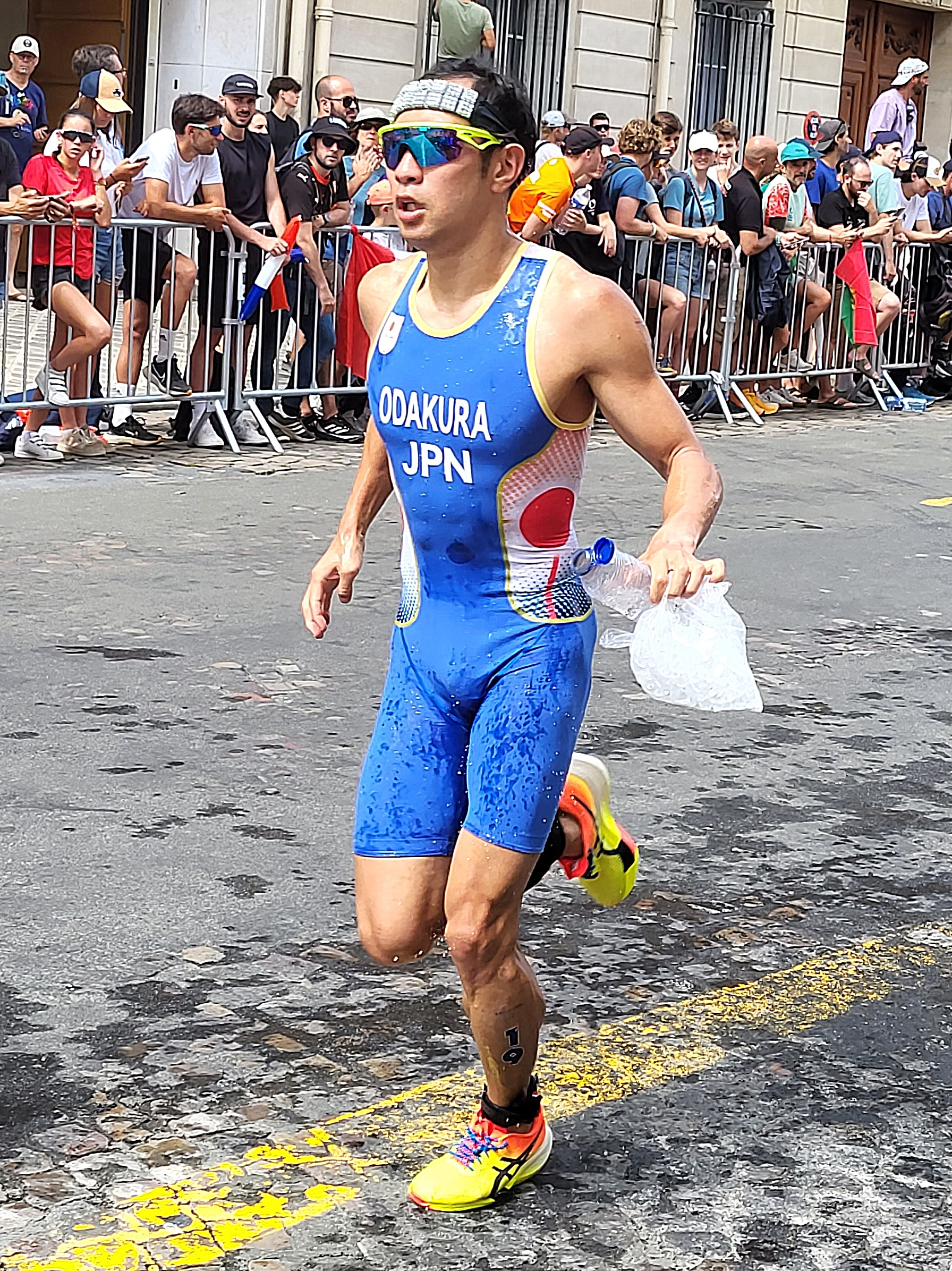
- Odakura competing in the 2024 Summer Olympics

Personal information
- Nationality: Japanese
- Born: 20 July 1993 (age 33) Tokyo, Japan

Sport
- Sport: Triathlon
Medal record
Representing Japan
Men's triathlon
Asian Games
Silver medal – second place	2022 Hangzhou	Individual

Makoto Odakura (小田倉 真, born 20 July 1993) is a Japanese triathlete. He competed in the men's event at the 2020 Summer Olympics held in Tokyo, Japan. He also competed in the mixed relay event.
