= Jason Ng (triathlete) =

Hong Kong triathlon athlete

Medal record

Men's triathlon

Representing Hong Kong

Asian Games
Bronze medal – third place	2022 Hangzhou	Mixed relay

Asian Championships
Bronze medal – third place	2025 Hong Kong	Mixed relay

Jason Ng Tai Long Hardcastle (born 12 February 2000) is a triathlete from Hong Kong.

== Early life ==
He attended Yew Chung International School and was a keen footballer in his youth. He came to triathlon via cross country running.

== Career ==
He was an Asian Games bronze medallist in 2022 in the team relay. At the Asia Triathlon Championships 2022 held in Kazakhstan, he was part of the Hong Kong triathlon team that won silver.

He won team gold at Asian U23 Championships in 2023. He won silver at the 2023 Asian Sprint Championships.

In February 2024, Ng was involved in a near road traffic accident, struck by a bus whilst out training on his bike near Ma Mei Ha in Fanling, Hong Kong. In May 2024, he qualified to compete at the 2024 Paris Olympics.

== Personal life ==
He is studying engineering at Hong Kong University of Science and Technology.
