= Zhang Yi (triathlete) =

Chinese triathlete

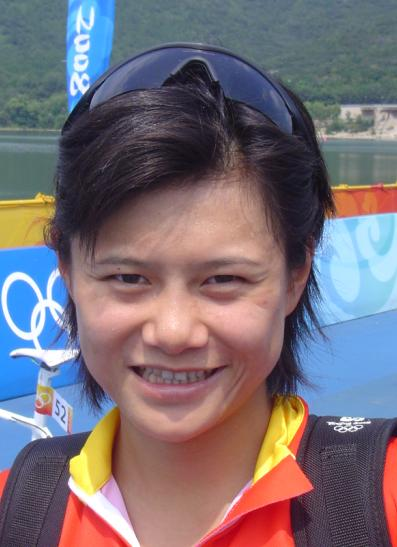
Zhang at the 2008 Summer Olympics.

Zhang Yi (simplified Chinese: 张一; traditional Chinese: 張一; pinyin: Zhāng Yī; born January 30, 1987, in Chengdu, Sichuan) is a female Chinese triathlete. She competed at the 2008 Summer Olympics (Rank 42) and 2012 Summer Olympics.

== See also ==
- China at the 2012 Summer Olympics#Triathlon
- Triathlon at the 2012 Summer Olympics – Women's
