= Oscar Coggins =

Hong Kong triathlete

Personal information
- Nationality: Chinese (Hong Kong) (2018–); British (1999–2018)
- Citizenship: Hong Kong (1999–)
- Born: Oscar Louis Coggins; October 7, 1999 (age 27) Hong Kong
Medal record
Men's triathlon
Representing Hong Kong
ITU Asian Championships
Gold medal – first place	2019 Gyeongju	Individual
Representing United Kingdom
ITU Asian Championships
Bronze medal – third place	2016 Hatsukaichi	Mixed Relay

Oscar Louis Coggins (Chinese: 奧斯卡; born October 7, 1999) is a triathlon athlete from Hong Kong.

Coggins attended Millfield School from 2016 to 2018. In 2018, he renounced his British citizenship in order to represent this birth place Hong Kong in the Olympics and other games. He represented Hong Kong at the 2020 Olympics, following in Daniel Lee's footsteps as the second male triathlete representing the region at the Olympic Games and placed the highest of any Hong Kong triathlete. He finished a 33rd in the men's triathlon at Tokyo 2020.
