= Hoi Long =

Macau triathlete

Personal information
- Nickname: Iron Lady
- Nationality: Macau
- Born: 26 July 1984 (age 42) Macau
- Education: Beijing Sport University
Medal record
Representing Macau
Women's triathlon
Asian Games
Bronze medal – third place	2018 Jakarta	Individual

Hoi Long (Chinese: 許朗; pinyin: Xǔ Lǎng; born 26 July 1984) is a Macau triathlete who won bronze at the 2018 Asian Games in the individual event. She has competed in the Asian Games in the triathlon since 2006. She works for the Sports Bureau of Macau.

Long is deaf and has been since she was five months old.
