= Bodybuilding at the 2008 Asian Beach Games =

- Venue: Kuta Beach
- Dates: 19–20 October 2008

Bodybuilding at the 2008 Asian Beach Games was held in Bali, Indonesia from 19 October to 20 October 2008. The competition included only men's events for six different weight categories. All events were held at Kuta Beach.

== Medalists ==
Event	Gold	Silver	Bronze
60 kg	Asrelawandi; Indonesia	Phạm Văn Mách; Vietnam	Daljit Singh; India
65 kg	Nguyễn Văn Lâm; Vietnam	Somkhit Sumethowetchakun; Thailand	Kim Jin-sik; South Korea
70 kg	Mohammed Salem Al-Zahmi; United Arab Emirates	Somsri Turinthaisong; Thailand	Yang Xinmin; China
75 kg	Syafrizaldi; Indonesia	Kim Myung-sub; South Korea	Muhammad Imran Qureshi; Pakistan
80 kg	Sitthi Charoenrith; Thailand	Mohammad Hosni; Jordan	Kim Chong-won; South Korea
85 kg	Lee Jin-ho; South Korea	Hsu Chung-huang; Chinese Taipei	Mohammed Ali Ahli; United Arab Emirates

== Medal table ==
Rank	Nation	Gold	Silver	Bronze	Total
1	Indonesia (INA)	2	0	0	2
2	Thailand (THA)	1	2	0	3
3	South Korea (KOR)	1	1	2	4
4	Vietnam (VIE)	1	1	0	2
5	United Arab Emirates (UAE)	1	0	1	2
6	Chinese Taipei (TPE)	0	1	0	1
6	Jordan (JOR)	0	1	0	1
8	China (CHN)	0	0	1	1
8	India (IND)	0	0	1	1
8	Pakistan (PAK)	0	0	1	1
Totals (10 entries)		6	6	6	18

== Results ==
=== 60 kg ===
19–20 October

Rank	Athlete	Prej.	Final
1st place, gold medalist(s)	Asrelawandi (INA)	7	14
2nd place, silver medalist(s)	Phạm Văn Mách (VIE)	22	44
3rd place, bronze medalist(s)	Daljit Singh (IND)	30	50
4	Jung Kuk-hyun (KOR)	22	52
5	Kazumi Kokubo (JPN)	29	66
6	Jiraphan Pongkam (THA)	35	68
7	Ireneo Dianso (PHI)	53	
8	Gyan Narayan Mahartan (NEP)	54	
9	Mohamed Rasheed (MDV)	66	
10	W. M. Jayathilaka (SRI)	70	
11	Mahmood Ziyad (MDV)	71	
12	Ravi Kumar (IND)	88	
13	Abdulrahim Abdulrahman (SIN)	89	

=== 65 kg ===
19–20 October

Rank	Athlete	Prej.	Final
1st place, gold medalist(s)	Nguyễn Văn Lâm (VIE)	13	20
2nd place, silver medalist(s)	Somkhit Sumethowetchakun (THA)	13	32
3rd place, bronze medalist(s)	Kim Jin-sik (KOR)	20	42
4	Fu Zhong (CHN)	24	48
5	Buda Anchah (MAS)	40	70
6	Hiroshi Tsuda (JPN)	34	82
7	Kishan Nepram (IND)	52	
8	Mohd Hamiruddin Haron (MAS)	57	
9	Chan Ming Yin (HKG)	59	
10	Shyam Shrestha (NEP)	72	
11	Lei Sio Lon (MAC)	75	
12	Mohamed Ibrahim Mohamed (MDV)	84	

=== 70 kg ===
19–20 October

Rank	Athlete	Prej.	Final
1st place, gold medalist(s)	Mohammed Salem Al-Zahmi (UAE)	13	19
2nd place, silver medalist(s)	Somsri Turinthaisong (THA)	17	34
3rd place, bronze medalist(s)	Yang Xinmin (CHN)	27	46
4	Noh Woo-hyun (KOR)	25	59
5	Koji Godo (JPN)	28	67
6	Win Aung Khaing (MYA)	38	69
7	Khalid Ali (PAK)	48	
8	Taat Pribadi (INA)	53	
9	Sê Pha (VIE)	63	
10	Victor Wong (HKG)	69	
11	Biru Maharjan (NEP)	76	
12	Pallethla Vinne Upali (SRI)	80	

=== 75 kg ===
19–20 October

Rank	Athlete	Prej.	Final
1st place, gold medalist(s)	Syafrizaldi (INA)	7	14
2nd place, silver medalist(s)	Kim Myung-sub (KOR)	18	37
3rd place, bronze medalist(s)	Muhammad Imran Qureshi (PAK)	23	44
4	Lam Chak Leung (HKG)	41	58
5	Yoshihiro Yano (JPN)	26	67
6	Kongthit Hanchaiyutthakorn (THA)	45	71
7	Zaw Min (MYA)	47	
8	Ke Cheng-hung (TPE)	54	
9	Naing Zaw Thein (MYA)	60	
10	Nguyễn Văn Hạnh (VIE)	66	
11	Anwar Al-Balushi (OMA)	76	
12	Iao Chong Wa (MAC)	78	

=== 80 kg ===
19–20 October

Rank	Athlete	Prej.	Final
1st place, gold medalist(s)	Sitthi Charoenrith (THA)	7	14
2nd place, silver medalist(s)	Mohammad Hosni (JOR)	14	30
3rd place, bronze medalist(s)	Kim Chong-won (KOR)	22	45
4	Haji Shaban Al-Balushi (OMA)	32	54
5	Naing Aung Swe (MYA)	45	76
5	Masashi Suzuki (JPN)	36	76
7	Hendra (INA)	50	
8	Jesus Duga (PHI)	53	
9	Nguyễn Anh Tài (VIE)	60	
10	Huang Kai-pin (TPE)	72	
11	Ngô Quang Trung (VIE)	76	
12	Amit Chaudhary (IND)	77	
13	Wong Chong Ieong (MAC)	91	

=== 85 kg ===
19–20 October

Rank	Athlete	Prej.	Final
1st place, gold medalist(s)	Lee Jin-ho (KOR)	13	14
2nd place, silver medalist(s)	Hsu Chung-huang (TPE)	14	36
3rd place, bronze medalist(s)	Mohammed Ali Ahli (UAE)	22	42
4	Pala Meechai (THA)	24	54
5	Masato Shimoda (JPN)	33	61
6	Yefta Leonidas (INA)	42	84
7	Prasad Kumar Gopinath (IND)	52	
8	Hani Abdullatif (JOR)	55	
9	Wei Lei (CHN)	59	
