= Beach woodball at the 2008 Asian Beach Games =

- Venue: Nusa Dua
- Dates: 18–22 October 2008

Woodball at the 2008 Asian Beach Games was held from 18 October to 22 October 2008 in Bali, Indonesia.

== Medalists ==
Event	Gold	Silver	Bronze
Men's singles	Ng Yeow Gim; Singapore	Arifin Mamat; Malaysia	Syed Bakar Osman; Malaysia
Men's team	Malaysia; Syed Bakar Osman; Arifin Mamat; Jamil Mat Ali; Azmi Ahmad; Sharnuddin Ngah; Abdullah Ahmad	Thailand; Withee Sriyo; Samon Khonlam; Jukkarin Khunthong; Prom Pronsane; Suriyan Sunthonghao; Somphan Burijan	Chinese Taipei; Yueh Wei-lun; Hsiao Chia-hung; Tsai Meng-hung; Yang Chih-cheng; Chen Chi-lin; Su Hung-wen
Women's singles	Ssu Pei-ju; Chinese Taipei	Tseng Hsin-i; Chinese Taipei	Chiang Fang-yu; Chinese Taipei
Women's team	Chinese Taipei; Ssu Pei-ju; Tseng Hsin-i; Chiang Fang-yu; Wu Chih-han; Chiu Ya-ting; Wang Hui-jung	Thailand; Monta Punprom; Yuwadee Boonsawak; Ratanaporn Shongpranam; Chantree Yungyuen; Daranee Samranphol; Wanpen Suwannachairoi	Indonesia; Ika Yulianingsih; Setyani Aris; Ismini; Sukiyanti; Kartini; Panji Rahayu Yeni

== Medal table ==
Rank	Nation	Gold	Silver	Bronze	Total
1	Chinese Taipei (TPE)	2	1	2	5
2	Malaysia (MAS)	1	1	1	3
3	Singapore (SIN)	1	0	0	1
4	Thailand (THA)	0	2	0	2
5	Indonesia (INA)	0	0	1	1
Totals (5 entries)		4	4	4	12

== Results ==
=== Men's singles ===
18–22 October

Rank	Athlete	Prel.	Final
1st place, gold medalist(s)	Ng Yeow Gim (SIN)	332	451
2nd place, silver medalist(s)	Arifin Mamat (MAS)	341	454
3rd place, bronze medalist(s)	Syed Bakar Osman (MAS)	340	455
4	Samon Khonlam (THA)	351	467
5	Withee Sriyo (THA)	345	467
6	Jamil Mat Ali (MAS)	356	468
7	Yueh Wei-lun (TPE)	353	468
8	Hsiao Chia-hung (TPE)	354	470
9	Tsai Meng-hung (TPE)	357	472
10	Masrun (INA)	352	475
11	Yang Chih-cheng (TPE)	358	476
12	Jukkarin Khunthong (THA)	358	485
13	Mohd Taha Mahwan (SIN)	358	
14	Martius Bungan (INA)	359	
15	Samaji (INA)	361	
16	Azmi Ahmad (MAS)	361	
17	Prom Pronsane (THA)	362	
18	Sharnuddin Ngah (MAS)	370	
19	Mohd Yusof Abdulrahman (SIN)	370	
20	Suriyan Sunthonghao (THA)	370	
21	Chen Chi-lin (TPE)	371	
22	Peh Thiam Heng (SIN)	379	
23	Setyawan (INA)	390	
24	Chan Hock Hooi (SIN)	392	
25	Neo Hock Leng (SIN)	393	
26	Somphan Burijan (THA)	403	
27	Surono (INA)	408	
28	Daniel Kapitung (INA)	408	
29	Su Hung-wen (TPE)	410	
30	Abdullah Ahmad (MAS)	411	
31	Ganboldyn Batmyagmar (MGL)	433	
32	Nominchuluuny Shinebaatar (MGL)	442	
33	Batboldyn Battulga (MGL)	458	
34	Bandiin Mönkhbat (MGL)	461	
35	Damdinsürengiin Tserenbold (MGL)	464	
36	Suraj Yeotikar (IND)	487	
37	Jalaagiin Buyandalai (MGL)	496	
38	Teodulfo Villaflor (PHI)	502	
39	Noah Nocon (PHI)	521	
40	Kapil Kumar Sahu (IND)	525	
41	Joshua John Santiago (PHI)	564	
42	Rakesh Tiwari (IND)	591	
43	Pravin Manwatkar (IND)	625	
—	Jawaharmal Purohit (IND)	DNS	

=== Men's team ===
18–21 October

Rank	Team	Score
1st place, gold medalist(s)	Malaysia (MAS)	1398
2nd place, silver medalist(s)	Thailand (THA)	1416
3rd place, bronze medalist(s)	Chinese Taipei (TPE)	1422
4	Singapore (SIN)	1439
5	Indonesia (INA)	1462
6	Mongolia (MGL)	1794
7	India (IND)	2228

=== Women's singles ===
18–22 October

Rank	Athlete	Prel.	Final
1st place, gold medalist(s)	Ssu Pei-ju (TPE)	342	453
2nd place, silver medalist(s)	Tseng Hsin-i (TPE)	355	469
3rd place, bronze medalist(s)	Chiang Fang-yu (TPE)	362	481
4	Monta Punprom (THA)	367	482
5	Wu Chih-han (TPE)	373	500
6	Yuwadee Boonsawak (THA)	370	503
7	Ratanaporn Shongpranam (THA)	376	505
8	Chiu Ya-ting (TPE)	383	509
9	Ika Yulianingsih (INA)	384	510
10	Lien Yen Wa (MAS)	389	521
11	Wang Hui-jung (TPE)	387	522
12	Chantree Yungyuen (THA)	394	530
13	Chang Gek Hong (SIN)	398	
14	Daranee Samranphol (THA)	401	
15	Zainal Akmal Awang (MAS)	408	
16	Wanpen Suwannachairoi (THA)	408	
17	Setyani Aris (INA)	411	
18	Ismini (INA)	414	
19	Suraini Abdul Hamid (MAS)	414	
20	Sukiyanti (INA)	417	
21	Kartini (INA)	418	
22	Widilestari Setianingsih (MAS)	419	
23	Aniah Hassan (MAS)	430	
24	Tang Kai Kian (SIN)	437	
25	Tan Sooi Kim (SIN)	440	
26	Panji Rahayu Yeni (INA)	450	
27	Loo Yan Geok (SIN)	450	
28	Chiew Phek Lin (SIN)	462	
29	Püreviin Khuslenzayaa (MGL)	511	
30	Damdinbazaryn Oyu (MGL)	514	
31	Barbaataryn Khishigjargal (MGL)	519	
32	Bayarkhüügiin Bayarmaa (MGL)	542	
33	Dixie Marinas (PHI)	562	
34	Seema Verma (IND)	654	
35	Darshana Yeotikar (IND)	720	
36	Bhawana Kasulkar (IND)	764	
—	Ayushree Deshmukh (IND)	DNS	
—	Gabrielle Dela Merced (PHI)	DNS	

=== Women's team ===
18–21 October

Rank	Team	Score
1st place, gold medalist(s)	Chinese Taipei (TPE)	1432
2nd place, silver medalist(s)	Thailand (THA)	1507
3rd place, bronze medalist(s)	Indonesia (INA)	1626
4	Malaysia (MAS)	1630
5	Singapore (SIN)	1725
6	Mongolia (MGL)	2086
