= Sailing at the 2008 Asian Beach Games =

- Venue: Serangan Island
- Dates: 21–25 October 2008

Sailing and Windsurfing at the 2008 Asian Beach Games were held from 21 October to 25 October 2008 in Bali, Indonesia.

== Medalists ==
=== Men ===
Event	Gold	Silver	Bronze
Mistral light	Cheng Kwok Fai; Hong Kong	Huang Yikai; China	Navin Sinsart; Thailand
Mistral heavy	Oka Sulaksana; Indonesia	Arun Homraruen; Thailand	Seksan Khunthong; Thailand
RS:X	Lee Tae-hoon; South Korea	Ho Chi Ho; Hong Kong	Fang Zhennan; China

=== Women ===
Event	Gold	Silver	Bronze
Mistral	Wang Shuijia; China	Chan Wai Kei; Hong Kong	Wang Shengmei; China

=== Open ===
Event	Gold	Silver	Bronze
Laser 4.7	Ni Xiaowen; China	Natthawut Paenyaem; Thailand	Keerati Bualong; Thailand
Hobie 16	Thailand; Kitsada Vongtim; Damrongsak Vongtim	Hong Kong; Tong Yui Shing; Patrick Lam	Indonesia; Ario Dipo; Yoseph Udjulawa

== Medal table ==
Rank	Nation	Gold	Silver	Bronze	Total
1	China (CHN)	2	1	2	5
2	Hong Kong (HKG)	1	3	0	4
3	Thailand (THA)	1	2	3	6
4	Indonesia (INA)	1	0	1	2
5	South Korea (KOR)	1	0	0	1
Totals (5 entries)		6	6	6	18

== Results ==
=== Men ===
==== Mistral light ====
21–25 October

Rank	Athlete	Race										Total
Rank	Athlete	1	2	3	4	5	6	7	8	9	10	Total
1st place, gold medalist(s)	Cheng Kwok Fai (HKG)	1	1	~~(2)~~	2	2	2	1	2	1	1	13
2nd place, silver medalist(s)	Huang Yikai (CHN)	3	3	1	1	~~(14)~~	1	3	3	2	2	19
3rd place, bronze medalist(s)	Navin Sinsart (THA)	2	2	3	~~(4)~~	1	3	2	1	3	3	20
4	Gede Subagiasa (INA)	5	4	4	5	5	4	4	4	~~(7)~~	4	39
5	Astika Oye Wahyudi (INA)	4	5	~~(8)~~	3	6	8	5	5	6	5	47
6	Song Myung-keun (KOR)	6	6	5	6	4	6	~~(8)~~	7	4	6	50
7	Lee Byung-gun (KOR)	~~(9)~~	7	6	8	3	5	6	6	5	7	53
8	Aphichart Tibtabmark (THA)	7	~~(8)~~	7	7	7	7	7	8	8	8	66
9	Qasim Abbas (PAK)	8	~~(9)~~	9	9	8	9	9	9	9	9	79
10	Chameera Lakshan (SRI)	10	~~(11)~~	10	10	10	10	11	10	11	10	92
11	Melvin Huang (SIN)	~~(12)~~	10	11	11	9	11	10	11	10	12	95
12	Pathum Nishantha Thenkutti (SRI)	11	12	~~(13)~~	13	12	12	12	12	13	11	108
13	Ian Low (MAS)	~~(13)~~	13	12	12	11	13	13	13	12	13	112

==== Mistral heavy ====
21–25 October

Rank	Athlete	Race										Total
Rank	Athlete	1	2	3	4	5	6	7	8	9	10	Total
1st place, gold medalist(s)	Oka Sulaksana (INA)	1	1	1	1	~~(3)~~	1	1	1	1	1	9
2nd place, silver medalist(s)	Arun Homraruen (THA)	2	2	2	~~(4)~~	2	2	3	2	2	2	19
3rd place, bronze medalist(s)	Seksan Khunthong (THA)	5	3	4	2	1	3	2	4	3	~~(6)~~	27
4	Moon Chang-sung (KOR)	~~(6)~~	6	5	6	6	5	4	3	5	3	43
5	Wayan Wiranata (INA)	4	5	~~(6)~~	5	5	4	6	6	4	4	43
6	Muhammad Tanveer (PAK)	3	~~(7)~~	7	7	4	6	5	5	6	5	48
7	Lee Kyoung-hwan (KOR)	7	4	3	3	~~(8)~~	7	7	7	8	7	53
8	Priyantha Gunawardena (SRI)	~~(8)~~	8	8	8	7	8	8	8	7	8	70
9	Ziad Salhab (LIB)	~~(10)~~	10	10	10	10	10	10	9	9	9	87

==== RS:X ====
21–25 October

Rank	Athlete	Race										Total
Rank	Athlete	1	2	3	4	5	6	7	8	9	10	Total
1st place, gold medalist(s)	Lee Tae-hoon (KOR)	2	1	2	4	2	3	2	4	~~(5)~~	1	21
2nd place, silver medalist(s)	Ho Chi Ho (HKG)	3	3	1	1	~~(14)~~	1	3	3	2	2	23
3rd place, bronze medalist(s)	Fang Zhennan (CHN)	1	2	~~(6)~~	5	3	5	5	5	1	3	30
4	Ek Boonsawad (THA)	7	4	4	2	~~(8)~~	1	1	3	4	4	30
5	Chan King Yin (HKG)	5	5	3	1	1	7	7	1	2	~~(15)~~	32
6	Kim Hyung-kwon (KOR)	3	7	5	7	4	4	4	9	8	~~(15)~~	51
7	Natthaphong Phonoppharat (THA)	6	6	7	9	11	6	6	6	10	~~(15)~~	67
8	Badrul Sahid (INA)	8	8	10	6	6	~~(12)~~	10	8	7	6	69
9	Komang Suartana (INA)	9	10	8	10	7	10	~~(11)~~	7	6	5	72
10	Reneric Moreno (PHI)	10	~~(11)~~	9	8	10	8	8	11	11	9	84
11	German Paz (PHI)	~~(11)~~	9	11	11	9	9	9	10	9	8	85
12	Joshua Choo (SIN)	~~(12)~~	12	12	12	12	11	12	12	12	7	102
13	Khan Dad (PAK)	~~(13)~~	13	13	13	13	13	13	13	13	10	114
14	Jad Ghosn (LIB)	14	14	14	14	14	14	14	~~(15)~~	14	11	123

=== Women ===
==== Mistral ====
21–25 October

Rank	Athlete	Race										Total
Rank	Athlete	1	2	3	4	5	6	7	8	9	10	Total
1st place, gold medalist(s)	Wang Shuijia (CHN)	1	1	1	1	1	1	1	~~(6)~~	1	1	9
2nd place, silver medalist(s)	Chan Wai Kei (HKG)	2	3	2	3	2	3	~~(4)~~	1	3	4	23
3rd place, bronze medalist(s)	Wang Shengmei (CHN)	~~(5)~~	2	3	2	3	4	3	3	2	5	27
4	Napalai Tansai (THA)	3	4	4	~~(5)~~	4	2	2	5	4	2	30
5	Hayley Chan (HKG)	4	~~(5)~~	5	4	5	5	5	2	5	3	38
6	Hoiriyah (INA)	6	6	7	6	6	~~(8)~~	6	4	7	6	54
7	Phannipha Mangmeephol (THA)	9	8	6	7	8	6	7	9	8	~~(11)~~	68
8	Shin Ji-hyun (KOR)	8	7	~~(9)~~	9	9	7	8	7	6	8	69
9	Rivanti Natalia (INA)	7	~~(9)~~	8	8	7	9	9	6	9	7	72
10	Kang Ji-hye (KOR)	10	10	10	10	10	~~(11)~~	11	10	10	9	90

=== Open ===
==== Laser 4.7 ====
21–25 October

Rank	Athlete	Race										Total
Rank	Athlete	1	2	3	4	5	6	7	8	9	10	Total
1st place, gold medalist(s)	Ni Xiaowen (CHN)	5	~~(9)~~	3	7	1	3	1	3	1	2	26
2nd place, silver medalist(s)	Natthawut Paenyaem (THA)	2	2	4	2	5	2	3	2	~~(23)~~	4	26
3rd place, bronze medalist(s)	Keerati Bualong (THA)	1	1	5	10	7	1	2	1	~~(23)~~	6	34
4	Muhammad Ramlan (INA)	3	4	1	1	6	~~(20)~~	15	4	2	1	37
5	Khairulnizam Afendy (MAS)	12	3	2	3	8	4	8	8	5	~~(15)~~	53
6	Khairunneeta Afendy (MAS)	14	5	10	4	11	~~(17)~~	6	10	4	9	73
7	Omar Abdulaziz Abdulla (BRN)	8	8	12	11	2	10	5	~~(16)~~	9	10	75
8	Mark Wong (SIN)	9	12	8	14	~~(16)~~	8	7	5	10	3	76
9	Najwa Jumali (SIN)	~~(16)~~	11	6	8	9	15	12	7	3	7	78
10	Talal Al-Zaidi (UAE)	4	7	7	18	4	13	4	9	~~(23)~~	13	79
11	Rubin Cruz (PHI)	~~(18)~~	10	23	15	3	5	9	6	7	8	86
12	Burhanul Akram (INA)	6	6	15	6	23	~~(19)~~	19	13	6	5	99
13	Lee Gyeong-jin (KOR)	13	18	9	12	~~(23)~~	12	10	15	8	14	111
14	Mohammad Al-Turkumani (KUW)	10	16	13	17	~~(23)~~	7	14	11	13	20	121
15	Ahmed Abdulla Sadeq (BRN)	17	15	19	5	18	11	11	18	~~(23)~~	11	125
16	Lee Seung-min (KOR)	~~(20)~~	19	14	20	14	6	13	17	12	19	134
17	Abdulaziz Abdulla Al-Obaidli (UAE)	11	14	~~(23)~~	16	17	9	18	14	23	12	134
18	Radheeka Jirasinha (SRI)	7	13	11	9	~~(23)~~	21	22	12	23	17	125
19	Muhammad Abdur Rehman (PAK)	15	23	~~(23)~~	13	10	16	16	21	23	16	153
20	Ali Bohamad (KUW)	22	~~(23)~~	17	19	12	14	17	19	23	18	161
21	Anton Tereshchenko (UZB)	19	20	16	~~(22)~~	15	22	20	20	11	21	164
22	Pavel Tereshchenko (UZB)	21	17	18	21	13	18	21	~~(22)~~	14	22	165

==== Hobie 16 ====
21–25 October

Rank	Team	Race										Total
Rank	Team	1	2	3	4	5	6	7	8	9	10	Total
1st place, gold medalist(s)	Thailand (THA); Kitsada Vongtim; Damrongsak Vongtim	1	1	2	~~(3)~~	1	2	1	1	1	2	12
2nd place, silver medalist(s)	Hong Kong (HKG); Tong Yui Shing; Patrick Lam	2	3	7	~~(9)~~	4	4	2	2	6	3	33
3rd place, bronze medalist(s)	Indonesia (INA); Ario Dipo Subagio; Yoseph Udjulawa	6	4	1	4	2	7	7	3	2	~~(12)~~	36
4	Philippines (PHI); Richly Magsanay; Rafael Buitre	~~(12)~~	2	4	1	7	1	3	12	3	4	37
5	Thailand (THA); Manat Phothong; Teerapong Watiboonruang	3	~~(8)~~	8	2	8	5	4	4	4	1	39
6	Indonesia (INA); Ario Dewo Subagio; Kris Soebiyantoro	7	6	3	6	~~(9)~~	3	9	5	5	6	50
7	Philippines (PHI); Ridgely Balladares; Rommel Chavez	4	5	5	5	6	~~(8)~~	6	6	8	5	50
8	Singapore (SIN); Jonathan Chew; Nicholas Paul De Cruz	8	7	6	8	5	6	5	~~(12)~~	7	8	60
9	Singapore (SIN); Faris Aznan; Andrew Chan	5	~~(12)~~	9	7	3	9	8	12	9	7	69
10	Kazakhstan (KAZ); Ruslan Jangazov; Pavel Vityushev	10	10	~~(11)~~	11	10	10	10	7	10	9	87
11	United Arab Emirates (UAE); Omar Al-Nuaimi; Marwan Al-Kaabi	9	9	10	10	~~(12)~~	12	11	8	11	10	90
