= Beach kabaddi at the 2008 Asian Beach Games =

- Venue: Tanjung Benoa
- Dates: 19–22 October 2008

Beach kabaddi at the 2008 Asian Beach Games was held from 19 October to 22 October 2008. Competitions were held at the Tanjung Benoa in Bali, Indonesia.

== Medalists ==
Event	Gold	Silver	Bronze
Men	India; Anup Kumar; Sanjeev Kumar; Nitin Ghule; Giri Babu Maraprolu; Aramm Venkitesh; Pramod Kumar; Omarshereef Keeralil Bava	Pakistan; Faryad Ali; Muhammad Akram; Wajid Ali; Waseem Sajjad; Nasir Ali; Muhammad Tajammol	Bangladesh; Al Mamun; Ziaur Rahman; Kamal Hossain; Sadaqul Islam; Maftun Haque; Jayed Hossain
Men	India; Anup Kumar; Sanjeev Kumar; Nitin Ghule; Giri Babu Maraprolu; Aramm Venkitesh; Pramod Kumar; Omarshereef Keeralil Bava	Pakistan; Faryad Ali; Muhammad Akram; Wajid Ali; Waseem Sajjad; Nasir Ali; Muhammad Tajammol	Thailand; Tituthai Chaimaspong; Krailat Khansri; Komsan Tongkam; Kitsana Jintakasikam; Chatchai Jaiarwut; Kraisorn Kampool
Women	India; Shital Ratnakar Marne; Kishore Dilip Shinde; Keena Kumari; Mamatha Poojary; Shermi Ulahannan	Thailand; Yaowaret Nitsara; Jittapa Tubjan; Kanokporn Phaensombun; Alisa Limsamran; Naleerat Ketsaro; Benjarat Sutthinon	Indonesia; Ni Luh Putu Indrawathi; Ni Luh Putu Risstya; Ni Putu Soma Apriantini; Desak Made Agustin Dewi; Ni Komang Ariningsih; Ni Made Sridevi
Women	India; Shital Ratnakar Marne; Kishore Dilip Shinde; Keena Kumari; Mamatha Poojary; Shermi Ulahannan	Thailand; Yaowaret Nitsara; Jittapa Tubjan; Kanokporn Phaensombun; Alisa Limsamran; Naleerat Ketsaro; Benjarat Sutthinon	South Korea; Park Jeong-suk; Kim Ye-hyang; Park Min-kyoung; An Hyeon-jeong; Kwon Kyeong-suk; Jang Hyeon-ju

== Medal table ==
Rank	Nation	Gold	Silver	Bronze	Total
1	India (IND)	2	0	0	2
2	Thailand (THA)	0	1	1	2
3	Pakistan (PAK)	0	1	0	1
4	Bangladesh (BAN)	0	0	1	1
4	Indonesia (INA)	0	0	1	1
4	South Korea (KOR)	0	0	1	1
Totals (6 entries)		2	2	4	8

== Results ==
=== Men ===
==== Preliminaries ====
Pos	Team	Pld	W	D	L	PF	PA	PD	Pts
1	Pakistan	5	4	1	0	312	115	+197	9
2	India	5	4	1	0	271	146	+125	9
3	Bangladesh	5	3	0	2	234	186	+48	6
4	Thailand	5	2	0	3	195	293	−98	4
5	Indonesia	5	1	0	4	172	299	−127	2
6	South Korea	5	0	0	5	110	255	−145	0

Source: Official website

19 October
9:00

Bangladesh	55–18 (HT: 29–7)	South Korea

Tanjung Benoa, Bali

19 October
9:45

India	67–32 (HT: 38–15)	Thailand

Tanjung Benoa, Bali

19 October
10:30

Indonesia	17–84 (HT: 7–42)	Pakistan

Tanjung Benoa, Bali

19 October
16:00

South Korea	32–52 (HT: 15–28)	Thailand

Tanjung Benoa, Bali

19 October
16:45

India	47–32 (HT: 27–19)	Bangladesh

Tanjung Benoa, Bali

20 October
9:00

Bangladesh	65–28 (HT: 32–9)	Thailand

Tanjung Benoa, Bali

20 October
9:45

Indonesia	26–62 (HT: 7–38)	India

Tanjung Benoa, Bali

20 October
10:30

Pakistan	50–9 (HT: 25–1)	South Korea

Tanjung Benoa, Bali

20 October
16:00

Indonesia	51–60 (HT: 33–29)	Thailand

Tanjung Benoa, Bali

20 October
16:45

Pakistan	59–25 (HT: 32–13)	Bangladesh

Tanjung Benoa, Bali

21 October
9:00

Thailand	23–78 (HT: 11–42)	Pakistan

Tanjung Benoa, Bali

21 October
9:00

Bangladesh	57–34 (HT: 26–20)	Indonesia

Tanjung Benoa, Bali

21 October
9:45

South Korea	15–54 (HT: 5–25)	India

Tanjung Benoa, Bali

21 October
16:00

South Korea	36–44 (HT: 18–21)	Indonesia

Tanjung Benoa, Bali

21 October
16:45

Pakistan	41–41 (HT: 23–20)	India

Tanjung Benoa, Bali

==== Final ====
22 October
9:00

India	37–32 (HT: 20–16)	Pakistan

Tanjung Benoa, Bali

=== Women ===
==== Preliminaries ====
Pos	Team	Pld	W	D	L	PF	PA	PD	Pts
1	India	4	4	0	0	281	150	+131	8
2	Thailand	4	3	0	1	255	223	+32	6
3	Indonesia	4	2	0	2	257	194	+63	4
4	South Korea	4	1	0	3	163	276	−113	2
5	Malaysia	4	0	0	4	194	307	−113	0

Source: Official website

19 October
9:00

Thailand	81–58 (HT: 43–23)	Malaysia

Tanjung Benoa, Bali

19 October
9:45

South Korea	23–87 (HT: 16–43)	Indonesia

Tanjung Benoa, Bali

19 October
16:00

India	73–33 (HT: 38–18)	Thailand

Tanjung Benoa, Bali

19 October
16:45

Indonesia	83–36 (HT: 20–32)	Malaysia

Tanjung Benoa, Bali

20 October
9:00

Indonesia	37–67 (HT: 18–36)	India

Tanjung Benoa, Bali

20 October
9:45

South Korea	62–56 (HT: 24–31)	Malaysia

Tanjung Benoa, Bali

20 October
16:00

India	81–44 (HT: 46–21)	Malaysia

Tanjung Benoa, Bali

20 October
16:45

South Korea	42–73 (HT: 21–42)	Thailand

Tanjung Benoa, Bali

21 October
16:00

South Korea	36–60 (HT: 16–36)	India

Tanjung Benoa, Bali

21 October
16:45

Thailand	68–50 (HT: 39–23)	Indonesia

Tanjung Benoa, Bali

==== Final ====
22 October
9:45

Thailand	38–65 (HT: 17–35)	India

Tanjung Benoa, Bali
