= Paragliding at the 2008 Asian Beach Games =

- Venue: Nusa Dua
- Dates: 20–24 October 2008

Paragliding at the 2008 Asian Beach Games was held from 20 October to 24 October 2008 in Bali, Indonesia.

== Medalists ==
=== Accuracy ===
Event	Gold	Silver	Bronze
Men's individual	Nanang Sunarya; Indonesia	Ha Chi-kyong; South Korea	Kim Jin-oh; South Korea
Men's team	South Korea; Ha Chi-kyong; Jung Se-yong; Kim Jin-oh; Lee Dong-jin; Phi Soo-yong	Indonesia; Teguh Maryanto; Nanang Sunarya; Acep Suparya; Tony Yudantoro Suwono; Thomas Widyananto	China; He Jingwei; Liu Haipeng; Wang Weijian; Yang Guang; Zhang Shupeng
Women's individual	Dyan Apriyanti; Indonesia	Dian Rosnalia; Indonesia	Milawati Sirin; Indonesia
Women's team	Indonesia; Lis Andriana; Dyan Apriyanti; Dian Rosnalia; Milawati Sirin; Nofrica Yanti	Thailand; Suwimol Kerdtang; Netikan Paosopa; Rungcharoen Petlab; Nathanat Sirisawat; Punta Srila	South Korea; Kim Bok-soon; Park Jung-hoon; Park Koung-young

=== Cross-country ===
Event	Gold	Silver	Bronze
Men's individual	Thomas Widyananto; Indonesia	Ha Chi-kyong; South Korea	Teguh Maryanto; Indonesia
Men's team	Indonesia; Teguh Maryanto; Nanang Sunarya; Acep Suparya; Tony Yudantoro Suwono; Thomas Widyananto	South Korea; Jung Se-yong; Ha Chi-kyong; Kim Jin-oh; Lee Dong-jin; Phi Soo-yong	China; He Jingwei; Liu Haipeng; Wang Weijian; Yang Guang; Zhang Shupeng
Women's individual	Milawati Sirin; Indonesia	Park Koung-young; South Korea	Hou Xiangping; China
Women's team	Indonesia; Lis Andriana; Dyan Apriyanti; Dian Rosnalia; Milawati Sirin; Nofrica Yanti	China; Gu Ying; Hou Xiangping; Wei Jinqin; Zhu Yanhua	South Korea; Kim Bok-soon; Park Jung-hoon; Park Koung-young

== Medal table ==
Rank	Nation	Gold	Silver	Bronze	Total
1	Indonesia (INA)	7	2	2	11
2	South Korea (KOR)	1	4	3	8
3	China (CHN)	0	1	3	4
4	Thailand (THA)	0	1	0	1
Totals (4 entries)		8	8	8	24

== Results ==
=== Accuracy ===
==== Men's individual ====
20–23 October

Rank	Athlete	Score
1st place, gold medalist(s)	Nanang Sunarya (INA)	21
2nd place, silver medalist(s)	Ha Chi-kyong (KOR)	31
3rd place, bronze medalist(s)	Kim Jin-oh (KOR)	32
4	He Jingwei (CHN)	57
5	Thomas Widyananto (INA)	113
6	Phi Soo-yong (KOR)	116
7	Acep Suparya (INA)	130
8	Saburo Yokota (JPN)	141
9	Lee Dong-jin (KOR)	178
10	Sompong Baosoongnern (THA)	198
11	Teguh Maryanto (INA)	204
11	Zhang Shupeng (CHN)	204
13	Akira Kojima (JPN)	257
14	Kampol Samngamnim (THA)	290
15	Masami Yatsugi (JPN)	362
16	Jung Se-yong (KOR)	527
17	Yang Guang (CHN)	586
18	Umpon Srila (THA)	966
19	Liu Haipeng (CHN)	1021
20	Tony Yudantoro Suwono (INA)	1161
21	Koji Kikuta (JPN)	1629
22	Wang Weijian (CHN)	1732
23	Pitak Monmuang (THA)	2305
24	Nopporn Kongdum (THA)	2773

==== Men's team ====
20–23 October

Rank	Team	Score
1st place, gold medalist(s)	South Korea (KOR)	288
2nd place, silver medalist(s)	Indonesia (INA)	364
3rd place, bronze medalist(s)	China (CHN)	1253
4	Japan (JPN)	2204
5	Thailand (THA)	2664

==== Women's individual ====
20–23 October

Rank	Athlete	Score
1st place, gold medalist(s)	Dyan Apriyanti (INA)	300
2nd place, silver medalist(s)	Dian Rosnalia (INA)	328
3rd place, bronze medalist(s)	Milawati Sirin (INA)	463
4	Netikan Paosopa (THA)	547
5	Park Jung-hoon (KOR)	702
6	Gu Ying (CHN)	792
7	Nathanat Sirisawat (THA)	854
8	Kim Bok-soon (KOR)	855
9	Zhu Yanhua (CHN)	865
10	Nofrica Yanti (INA)	1056
11	Park Koung-young (KOR)	1510
12	Rungcharoen Petlab (THA)	1633
13	Hou Xiangping (CHN)	1686
14	Lis Andriana (INA)	2014
15	Shazlisha Sahar (MAS)	2209
15	Kumi Igarashi (JPN)	2209
17	Punta Srila (THA)	2313
18	Wei Jinqin (CHN)	2346
19	Yoko Kawamura (JPN)	2389
20	Shazimlia Sahar (MAS)	2445
21	Suwimol Kerdtang (THA)	3024

==== Women's team ====
20–23 October

Rank	Team	Score
1st place, gold medalist(s)	Indonesia (INA)	1791
2nd place, silver medalist(s)	Thailand (THA)	4347
3rd place, bronze medalist(s)	South Korea (KOR)	5122
4	China (CHN)	5428
5	Japan (JPN)	11598
6	Malaysia (MAS)	11654

=== Cross-country ===
==== Men's individual ====
20–24 October

Rank	Athlete	Score
1st place, gold medalist(s)	Thomas Widyananto (INA)	2479
2nd place, silver medalist(s)	Ha Chi-kyong (KOR)	2476
3rd place, bronze medalist(s)	Teguh Maryanto (INA)	2464
4	Tony Yudantoro Suwono (INA)	2454
5	Phi Soo-yong (KOR)	2446
5	Jung Se-yong (KOR)	2446
7	Kim Jin-oh (KOR)	2428
8	Wang Weijian (CHN)	2419
9	Lee Dong-jin (KOR)	2412
10	Nanang Sunarya (INA)	2389
11	Zhang Shupeng (CHN)	2385
12	Pitak Monmuang (THA)	2363
12	Acep Suparya (INA)	2363
14	Kampol Samngamnim (THA)	2353
14	Koji Kikuta (JPN)	2353
16	Sompong Baosoongnern (THA)	2332
17	Umpon Srila (THA)	2323
18	Liu Haipeng (CHN)	2320
19	Akira Kojima (JPN)	2209
20	He Jingwei (CHN)	2180
21	Nopporn Kongdum (THA)	2151
22	Saburo Yokota (JPN)	2053
23	Masami Yatsugi (JPN)	1886
24	Yang Guang (CHN)	1611

==== Men's team ====
20–24 October

Rank	Team	Score
1st place, gold medalist(s)	Indonesia (INA)	7397
2nd place, silver medalist(s)	South Korea (KOR)	7386
3rd place, bronze medalist(s)	China (CHN)	7196
4	Thailand (THA)	7060
5	Japan (JPN)	6768

==== Women's individual ====
20–24 October

Rank	Athlete	Score
1st place, gold medalist(s)	Milawati Sirin (INA)	1771
2nd place, silver medalist(s)	Park Koung-young (KOR)	1736
3rd place, bronze medalist(s)	Hou Xiangping (CHN)	1703
4	Kim Bok-soon (KOR)	1671
5	Yoko Kawamura (JPN)	1659
6	Nofrica Yanti (INA)	1655
7	Zhu Yanhua (CHN)	1637
8	Dian Rosnalia (INA)	1620
9	Gu Ying (CHN)	1617
10	Punta Srila (THA)	1568
11	Suwimol Kerdtang (THA)	1544
12	Dyan Apriyanti (INA)	1540
13	Park Jung-hoon (KOR)	1419
14	Lis Andriana (INA)	1401
15	Netikan Paosopa (THA)	1379
16	Rungcharoen Petlab (THA)	1377
17	Kumi Igarashi (JPN)	1369
18	Nathanat Sirisawat (THA)	835
19	Shazlisha Sahar (MAS)	633
20	Wei Jinqin (CHN)	476
21	Shazimlia Sahar (MAS)	332

==== Women's team ====
20–24 October

Rank	Team	Score
1st place, gold medalist(s)	Indonesia (INA)	5055
2nd place, silver medalist(s)	China (CHN)	4957
3rd place, bronze medalist(s)	South Korea (KOR)	4826
4	Thailand (THA)	4629
5	Japan (JPN)	3028
6	Malaysia (MAS)	965
