= 3x3 basketball at the 2008 Asian Beach Games =

- Venue: Tanjung Benoa
- Dates: 24–26 October 2008

3x3 basketball at the 2008 Asian Beach Games were held from 24 to 26 October 2008 in Bali, Indonesia. The boys and girls' tournaments are under-17 events.

== Medalists ==
Event	Gold	Silver	Bronze
Men	India; Pratham Singh; Arjun Singh; Sunil Kumar Rathee; Vishesh Bhriguvanshi	Philippines; Joseph Tolentino; Arthur dela Cruz; Papot Paredes; Sam Marata	Malaysia; Heh Boon Pin; Sua Chee Huat; Kuek Tian Yuan; Te Kok Lim
Women	Japan; Mai Komeda; Yuko Toyama; Asami Chiku; Aoi Katsura	Thailand; Suwimon Sangtad; Aungkana Buapa; Chollada Chaiyasong; Kornkanok Kotcharat	India; Lutukurthy Deepa; Smruthi Radhakrishnan; Stephy Nixon; Kavita

== Medal table ==
Rank	Nation	Gold	Silver	Bronze	Total
1	India (IND)	1	0	1	2
2	Japan (JPN)	1	0	0	1
3	Philippines (PHI)	0	1	0	1
3	Thailand (THA)	0	1	0	1
5	Malaysia (MAS)	0	0	1	1
Totals (5 entries)		2	2	2	6

== Results ==
=== Men ===
==== Preliminaries ====
===== Group A =====
Pos	Team	Pld	W	L	PF	PA	PD	Pts
1	India	3	3	0	101	53	+48	6
2	Malaysia	3	2	1	69	76	−7	5
3	Singapore	3	1	2	76	91	−15	4
4	Indonesia	3	0	3	69	95	−26	3

Source: Official website

24 October
8:00

Indonesia	21–27	Malaysia

Tanjung Benoa, Bali
Referees: Goh Poh Seng (SIN)

24 October
11:00

India	33–21	Singapore

Tanjung Benoa, Bali
Referees: Ho Kok Yew (MAS)

24 October
14:00

Malaysia	14–34	India

Tanjung Benoa, Bali
Referees: Peng Ling (CHN)

25 October
11:00

Singapore	34–30	Indonesia

Tanjung Benoa, Bali
Referees: Ho Kok Yew (MAS)

25 October
13:20

Malaysia	28–21	Singapore

Tanjung Benoa, Bali
Referees: Ibnu Susilo (INA)

25 October
16:00

India	34–18	Indonesia

Tanjung Benoa, Bali
Referees: Yoko Tomita (JPN)

===== Group B =====
Pos	Team	Pld	W	L	PF	PA	PD	Pts
1	Philippines	3	3	0	99	49	+50	6
2	Kuwait	3	2	1	84	93	−9	5
3	Thailand	3	1	2	72	79	−7	4
4	Japan	3	0	3	62	96	−34	3

Source: Official website

24 October
9:30

Philippines	33–22	Kuwait

Tanjung Benoa, Bali
Referees: Ibnu Susilo (INA)

24 October
12:30

Japan	13–34	Thailand

Tanjung Benoa, Bali
Referees: Herman (INA)

24 October
15:30

Thailand	6–33	Philippines

Tanjung Benoa, Bali
Referees: Yoko Tomita (JPN)

25 October
12:10

Japan	28–29	Kuwait

Tanjung Benoa, Bali
Referees: Ibnu Susilo (INA)

25 October
14:40

Thailand	32–33	Kuwait

Tanjung Benoa, Bali
Referees: Ho Kok Yew (MAS)

25 October
16:20

Philippines	33–21	Japan

Tanjung Benoa, Bali
Referees: Goh Poh Seng (SIN)

==== Final round ====
===== 7th place match =====
26 October
9:00

Indonesia	18–16	Japan

Tanjung Benoa, Bali
Referees: Ho Kok Yew (MAS)

===== 5th place match =====
26 October
9:45

Singapore	8–17	Thailand

Tanjung Benoa, Bali
Referees: Herman (INA)

===== 3rd place match =====
26 October
11:15

Malaysia	33–22	Kuwait

Tanjung Benoa, Bali
Referees: Susilo (INA), Goh (SIN)

===== Final =====
26 October
12:45

India	23–17	Philippines

Tanjung Benoa, Bali
Referees: Susilo (INA), Ho (MAS)

=== Women ===
==== Preliminaries ====
Pos	Team	Pld	W	L	PF	PA	PD	Pts
1	Japan	4	4	0	123	83	+40	8
2	Thailand	4	3	1	130	100	+30	7
3	Malaysia	4	2	2	113	113	0	6
4	India	4	1	3	93	111	−18	5
5	Indonesia	4	0	4	71	123	−52	4

Source: Official website

24 October
8:45

Indonesia	22–23	Malaysia

Tanjung Benoa, Bali
Referees: Yoko Tomita (JPN)

24 October
10:15

India	18–33	Thailand

Tanjung Benoa, Bali
Referees: Peng Ling (CHN)

24 October
11:45

Japan	32–13	Indonesia

Tanjung Benoa, Bali
Referees: Goh Poh Seng (SIN)

24 October
14:45

Malaysia	31–28	India

Tanjung Benoa, Bali
Referees: Ibnu Susilo (INA)

24 October
16:15

Thailand	30–31	Japan

Tanjung Benoa, Bali
Referees: Ho Kok Yew (MAS)

25 October
10:35

India	34–17	Indonesia

Tanjung Benoa, Bali
Referees: Yoko Tomita (JPN)

25 October
11:35

Malaysia	32–33	Thailand

Tanjung Benoa, Bali
Referees: Herman (INA)

25 October
12:50

Japan	30–13	India

Tanjung Benoa, Bali
Referees: Herman (INA)

25 October
14:05

Thailand	34–19	Indonesia

Tanjung Benoa, Bali
Referees: Goh Poh Seng (SIN)

25 October
15:20

Malaysia	27–30	Japan

Tanjung Benoa, Bali
Referees: Peng Ling (CHN)

==== Final round ====
===== 3rd place match =====
26 October
10:30

Malaysia	25–34	India

Tanjung Benoa, Bali
Referees: Tomita (JPN), Goh (SIN)

===== Final =====
26 October
12:00

Japan	33–27	Thailand

Tanjung Benoa, Bali
Referees: Peng (CHN), Herman (INA)
