= Nitin Ghule =

Indian Kabaddi Player (born 1986)

Personal information
- Native name: नितीन घुले
- Full name: Nitin Govardhan Ghule
- Nationality: Indian
- Born: 20 May 1986 (age 40) Pune

Sport
- Country: India
- Sport: Kabaddi
- Event: 2010 Guangzhou - Gold
Asian Games
Men's Kabaddi
Representing India
2010 Guangzhou
Gold medal – first place	2010 Guangzhou	Men's group
- Updated on 19 January 2016

Nitin Govardhan Ghule (Marathi:नितीन घुले) (born 20 May 1986) is an Indian Kabaddi Player. He is a gold medalist in the Guangzhou Asian Games, 2010. He started to play with Adinath Sports club, Bopkhel, Pune since childhood. He was a part of teams in various national and international competitions, including the 2008 Asian Beach Games.

== See also ==
- Kabaddi at the 2010 Asian Games
- Beach kabaddi at the 2008 Asian Beach Games
