= Surfing at the 2008 Asian Beach Games =

- Venue: Kuta Beach
- Dates: 19–23 October 2008

Surfing at the 2008 Asian Beach Games was held from 19 October to 23 October 2008 in Bali, Indonesia.

== Medalists ==
Event	Gold	Silver	Bronze
Men's shortboard	Made Widiarta; Indonesia	Made Raditya Rondi; Indonesia	Shigenori Suzuki; Japan
Men's shortboard	Made Widiarta; Indonesia	Made Raditya Rondi; Indonesia	Carlito Nogalo; Philippines
Men's longboard	Yuta Morimoto; Japan	Luke Landrigan; Philippines	Wayan Widana; Indonesia
Men's longboard	Yuta Morimoto; Japan	Luke Landrigan; Philippines	Husni Ridwan; Indonesia
Men's aerial	Dede Suryana; Indonesia	Yuichi Kurogi; Japan	Shuhei Kato; Japan
Men's aerial	Dede Suryana; Indonesia	Yuichi Kurogi; Japan	Made Adi Putra; Indonesia
Women's shortboard	Akiko Kiyonaga; Japan	Yasnyiar Bonne Gea; Indonesia	Marianita Alcala; Philippines
Women's shortboard	Akiko Kiyonaga; Japan	Yasnyiar Bonne Gea; Indonesia	Diah Rahayu Dewi; Indonesia
Team	Indonesia; Made Widiarta; Made Raditya Rondi; Dede Suryana; Made Adi Putra	Japan; Shigenori Suzuki; Shuhei Kato; Yuichi Kurogi; Akihiro Makino	Philippines; Dionesio Espejon; Luke Landrigan; Carlito Nogalo; Nildie Rietenbach
Team	Indonesia; Made Widiarta; Made Raditya Rondi; Dede Suryana; Made Adi Putra	Japan; Shigenori Suzuki; Shuhei Kato; Yuichi Kurogi; Akihiro Makino	Maldives; Abdulla Areef; Mohamed Irushad; Sharel Ameen

== Medal table ==
Rank	Nation	Gold	Silver	Bronze	Total
1	Indonesia (INA)	3	2	4	9
2	Japan (JPN)	2	2	2	6
3	Philippines (PHI)	0	1	3	4
4	Maldives (MDV)	0	0	1	1
Totals (4 entries)		5	5	10	20

== Results ==
=== Men's shortboard ===
19 October

==== Qualifying rounds ====
Athlete	Round 1			Round 2			Round 3			Semifinal		
Athlete	Heat	Score	Rank	Heat	Score	Rank	Heat	Score	Rank	Heat	Score	Rank
Made Raditya Rondi (INA)	4	17.00	1	6	16.50	1	11	17.05	1	14	17.00	1
Made Widiarta (INA)	1	14.00	1	5	13.90	1	11	16.35	2	14	14.15	2
Akihiro Makino (JPN)	3	11.85	1	5	13.10	2	11	10.90	3	=> Repechage 4		
Carlito Nogalo (PHI)	1	9.30	2	6	11.90	2	11	8.25	4	=> Repechage 4		
Shigenori Suzuki (JPN)	2	9.75	1	6	11.10	3	=> Repechage 2					
Dionesio Espejon (PHI)	4	7.50	2	5	8.95	3	=> Repechage 2					
Mohamed Irushad (MDV)	3	7.55	2	6	6.20	4	=> Repechage 2					
Abdulla Areef (MDV)	2	5.80	2	5	5.55	4	=> Repechage 2					
Lai Hoàng Phi (VIE)	2	3.65	3	=> Repechage 1								
Nguyễn Văn Định (VIE)	3	3.60	3	=> Repechage 1								

==== Repechages ====
Athlete	Repechage 1			Repechage 2			Repechage 3			Repechage 4			Repechage 5		
Athlete	Heat	Score	Rank	Heat	Score	Rank	Heat	Score	Rank	Heat	Score	Rank	Heat	Score	Rank
Shigenori Suzuki (JPN)	Lost in round 2			10	12.50	1	12	7.45	2	13	14.00	1	15	13.00	1
Carlito Nogalo (PHI)	Lost in round 3									13	12.40	2	15	3.95	2
Akihiro Makino (JPN)	Lost in round 3									13	11.75	3			
Dionesio Espejon (PHI)	Lost in round 2			9	10.75	1	12	12.15	1	13	8.65	4			
Mohamed Irushad (MDV)	Lost in round 2			9	7.45	2	12	7.40	3						
Abdulla Areef (MDV)	Lost in round 2			10	9.00	2	12	6.20	4						
Nguyễn Văn Định (VIE)	7	—	1	9	4.55	3									
Lai Hoàng Phi (VIE)	8	—	1	10	4.55	3									

==== Final rounds ====
Repechage semifinal		Grand final
		Made Raditya Rondi (INA)	17.20
Made Widiarta (INA)	14.25	Made Widiarta (INA)	18.50
Shigenori Suzuki (JPN)	7.75

=== Men's longboard ===
20 October

==== Qualifying rounds ====
Athlete	Round 1			Round 2			Round 3		
Athlete	Heat	Score	Rank	Heat	Score	Rank	Heat	Score	Rank
Luke Landrigan (PHI)	1	14.50	1	3	11.30	2	6	11.50	1
Yuta Morimoto (JPN)	2	8.90	2	3	12.45	1	6	3.75	2
Husni Ridwan (INA)	1	11.75	2	3	9.05	3	=> Repechage 2		
Wayan Widana (INA)	2	12.75	1	3	7.45	4	=> Repechage 2		
Ryuichi Kubo (JPN)	1	8.95	3	=> Repechage 1					
Abdulla Areef (MDV)	2	2.55	3	=> Repechage 1					
Lai Hoàng Phi (VIE)	1	2.60	4	=> Repechage 1					
Mohamed Irushad (MDV)	2	2.45	4	=> Repechage 1					

==== Repechages ====
Athlete	Repechage 1			Repechage 2			Repechage 3		
Athlete	Heat	Score	Rank	Heat	Score	Rank	Heat	Score	Rank
Wayan Widana (INA)	Lost in round 2			5	14.00	1	7	15.00	1
Husni Ridwan (INA)	Lost in round 2			5	12.95	2	7	10.15	2
Ryuichi Kubo (JPN)	4	14.00	1	5	12.20	3			
Lai Hoàng Phi (VIE)	4	6.05	2	5	5.30	4			
Abdulla Areef (MDV)	4	3.25	3						
Mohamed Irushad (MDV)	4	2.75	4						

==== Final rounds ====
Repechage semifinal		Grand final
		Luke Landrigan (PHI)	10.90
Yuta Morimoto (JPN)	16.75	Yuta Morimoto (JPN)	16.75
Wayan Widana (INA)	12.60

=== Men's aerial ===
22 October

Rank	Athlete	Qual.	SF	Final
1st place, gold medalist(s)	Dede Suryana (INA)	18.50	17.50	17.75
2nd place, silver medalist(s)	Yuichi Kurogi (JPN)	11.75	3.00	8.00
3rd place, bronze medalist(s)	Made Adi Putra (INA)	17.50	14.55	0.00
3rd place, bronze medalist(s)	Shuhei Kato (JPN)	7.25	3.25	0.00
5	Dionesio Espejon (PHI)	6.75	1.75	
6	Carlito Nogalo (PHI)	5.25	0.00	
7	Abdulla Areef (MDV)	0.00		
8	Mohamed Irushad (MDV)	0.00		

=== Women's shortboard ===
21 October

==== Qualifying rounds ====
Athlete	Round 1			Round 2			Round 3		
Athlete	Heat	Score	Rank	Heat	Score	Rank	Heat	Score	Rank
Akiko Kiyonaga (JPN)	1	9.50	1	3	9.00	2	6	13.00	1
Yasnyiar Bonne Gea (INA)	2	10.80	1	3	9.80	1	6	9.00	2
Satoko Azumi (JPN)	2	9.05	2	3	5.85	3	=> Repechage 2		
Nildie Rietenbach (PHI)	1	8.10	2	3	5.15	4	=> Repechage 2		
Marianita Alcala (PHI)	2	6.80	3	=> Repechage 1					
Diah Rahayu Dewi (INA)	1	5.55	3	=> Repechage 1					

==== Repechages ====
Athlete	Repechage 1			Repechage 2			Repechage 3		
Athlete	Heat	Score	Rank	Heat	Score	Rank	Heat	Score	Rank
Marianita Alcala (PHI)	4	—	1	5	15.25	1	7	13.00	1
Diah Rahayu Dewi (INA)	4	—	1	5	8.45	2	7	7.60	2
Nildie Rietenbach (PHI)	Lost in round 2			5	8.45	3			
Satoko Azumi (JPN)	Lost in round 2			5	4.60	4			

==== Final rounds ====
Repechage semifinal		Grand final
		Akiko Kiyonaga (JPN)	13.00
Yasnyiar Bonne Gea (INA)	14.00	Yasnyiar Bonne Gea (INA)	9.00
Marianita Alcala (PHI)	13.30

=== Team ===
23 October

Rank	Team	Round 1		Round 2		Round 3		Total
Rank	Team	Score	Pts	Score	Pts	Score	Pts	Total
1st place, gold medalist(s)	Indonesia (INA)	46.85	4	48.45	4	41.50	4	12
2nd place, silver medalist(s)	Japan (JPN)	34.45	3	35.70	3	33.35	3	9
3rd place, bronze medalist(s)	Philippines (PHI)	22.60	2	30.30	2	23.50	2	6
3rd place, bronze medalist(s)	Maldives (MDV)	DNS		15.40	1	12.60	1	2
