= Ho Chi Ho =

Hong Kong windsurf racer

Medal record

Men's sailing

Representing Hong Kong

Asian Games
Silver medal – second place	2006 Doha	Mistral heavy

Asian Beach Games
Silver medal – second place	2008 Bali	RS:X

Ho Chi Ho (Chinese: 何智豪, born 20 February 1981) is a sailor from Hong Kong, China who won a silver medal at the 2006 Asian Games in the mistral heavy class. He also competed at the 2000 Summer Olympics and the 2004 Summer Olympics.
