= Beach sepak takraw at the 2008 Asian Beach Games =

- Venue: Sanur Beach
- Dates: 18–25 October 2008

Beach sepak takraw at the 2008 Asian Beach Games were held from 18 October to 25 October 2008 in Bali, Indonesia.

== Medalists ==
Event	Gold	Silver	Bronze
Men's regu	Thailand	Myanmar	Malaysia
Men's regu	Thailand	Myanmar	Brunei
Men's team regu	Thailand	Myanmar	South Korea
Men's team regu	Thailand	Myanmar	Indonesia
Women's regu	China	Thailand	Philippines
Women's regu	China	Thailand	Indonesia
Women's team regu	Thailand	Indonesia	Vietnam
Women's team regu	Thailand	Indonesia	South Korea

== Medal table ==
Rank	Nation	Gold	Silver	Bronze	Total
1	Thailand (THA)	3	1	0	4
2	China (CHN)	1	0	0	1
3	Myanmar (MYA)	0	2	0	2
4	Indonesia (INA)	0	1	2	3
5	South Korea (KOR)	0	0	2	2
6	Brunei (BRU)	0	0	1	1
6	Malaysia (MAS)	0	0	1	1
6	Philippines (PHI)	0	0	1	1
6	Vietnam (VIE)	0	0	1	1
Totals (9 entries)		4	4	8	16

== Results ==
=== Men's regu ===
==== Preliminaries ====
===== Group A =====
Pos	Team	Pld	W	L	PF	PA	PD	Pts
1	Thailand	2	2	0	42	11	+31	4
2	Brunei	2	1	1	27	38	−11	2
3	Philippines	2	0	2	22	42	−20	0

Source: Official website

Date		Score	
23 Oct	Brunei	21–17	Philippines
23 Oct	Thailand	21–5	Philippines
23 Oct	Thailand	21–6	Brunei

===== Group B =====
Pos	Team	Pld	W	L	PF	PA	PD	Pts
1	Myanmar	3	3	0	63	44	+19	6
2	Malaysia	3	2	1	57	55	+2	4
3	Indonesia	3	1	2	56	61	−5	2
4	South Korea	3	0	3	47	63	−16	0

Source: Official website

Date		Score	
23 Oct	Malaysia	21–14	South Korea
23 Oct	Myanmar	21–15	Indonesia
23 Oct	Indonesia	20–21	Malaysia
23 Oct	Myanmar	21–14	South Korea
23 Oct	Indonesia	21–19	South Korea
23 Oct	Malaysia	15–21	Myanmar

==== Knockout round ====
Semifinals; 24 October		Final; 25 October
Thailand	21
Malaysia	13	Thailand	21
Myanmar	21	Myanmar	15
Brunei	17

=== Men's team regu ===
==== Preliminaries ====
===== Group A =====
Pos	Team	Pld	W	L	MF	MA	MD	Pts
1	Thailand	2	2	0	4	0	+4	4
2	Myanmar	2	1	1	2	3	−1	2
3	Malaysia	2	0	2	1	4	−3	0

Source: Official website

Date		Score		Regu 1	Regu 2	Regu 3
18 Oct	Thailand	2–0	Malaysia	21–11	21–8	
18 Oct	Myanmar	0–2	Thailand	18–21	15–21	
19 Oct	Malaysia	1–2	Myanmar	21–20	17–21	7–15

===== Group B =====
Pos	Team	Pld	W	L	MF	MA	MD	Pts
1	Indonesia	2	2	0	4	0	+4	4
2	South Korea	2	0	2	0	4	−4	0

Source: Official website

Date		Score		Regu 1	Regu 2	Regu 3
18 Oct	Indonesia	2–0	South Korea	21–8	21–12	
19 Oct	South Korea	0–2	Indonesia	14–21	12–21	

==== Knockout round ====
Semifinals; 20 October				Final; 21 October
Thailand	21	21
South Korea	9	17		Thailand	21	21
Indonesia	13	21	12	Myanmar	19	17
Myanmar	21	16	15

=== Women's regu ===
==== Preliminaries ====
===== Group X =====
Pos	Team	Pld	W	L	PF	PA	PD	Pts
1	China	3	3	0	63	52	+11	6
2	Indonesia	3	2	1	57	47	+10	4
3	Vietnam	3	1	2	57	55	+2	2
4	South Korea	3	0	3	40	63	−23	0

Source: Official website

Date		Score	
23 Oct	South Korea	19–21	China
23 Oct	Indonesia	21–18	Vietnam
23 Oct	South Korea	8–21	Indonesia
23 Oct	China	21–18	Vietnam
23 Oct	China	21–15	Indonesia
23 Oct	South Korea	13–21	Vietnam

===== Group Y =====
Pos	Team	Pld	W	L	PF	PA	PD	Pts
1	Thailand	2	2	0	42	5	+37	4
2	Philippines	2	0	2	5	42	−37	0

Source: Official website

Date		Score	
23 Oct	Thailand	21–2	Philippines
23 Oct	Thailand	21–3	Philippines

==== Knockout round ====
Semifinals; 24 October		Final; 25 October
China	21
Philippines	20	China	21
Thailand	21	Thailand	17
Indonesia	17

=== Women's team regu ===
==== Preliminaries ====
===== Group X =====
Pos	Team	Pld	W	L	MF	MA	MD	Pts
1	Vietnam	2	2	0	4	1	+3	4
2	South Korea	2	0	2	1	4	−3	0

Source: Official website

Date		Score		Regu 1	Regu 2	Regu 3
18 Oct	South Korea	0–2	Vietnam	13–21	20–21	
19 Oct	South Korea	1–2	Vietnam	21–17	11–21	13–15

===== Group Y =====
Pos	Team	Pld	W	L	MF	MA	MD	Pts
1	Thailand	2	2	0	4	0	+4	4
2	Indonesia	2	1	1	2	2	0	2
3	China	2	0	2	0	4	−4	0

Source: Official website

Date		Score		Regu 1	Regu 2	Regu 3
18 Oct	China	0–2	Thailand	5–21	9–21	
19 Oct	Thailand	2–0	Indonesia	21–10	21–12	
19 Oct	China	0–2	Indonesia	11–21	9–21	

==== Knockout round ====
Semifinals; 20 October			Final; 21 October
Vietnam	9	13
Indonesia	21	21	Indonesia	11	13
Thailand	21	21	Thailand	21	21
South Korea	4	12
