= Pencak silat at the 2008 Asian Beach Games =

- Venue: Tanjung Benoa
- Dates: 18–22 October 2008

Pencak Silat at the 2008 Asian Beach Games was held from 18 October to 22 October in Bali, Indonesia.

== Medalists ==
=== Men ===
Event	Gold	Silver	Bronze
Tunggal	I Gusti Ngurah Arya Yudha; Indonesia	Nguyễn Việt Anh; Vietnam	Khairul Bahrin Durahman; Brunei
Ganda	Indonesia; Dani Hamdani; Yusuf Effendi	Vietnam; Nguyễn Thanh Tùng; Trần Đức Nghĩa	Malaysia; Hafiz Arif; Helmi Aziz
Tanding class A 45–50 kg	Niphon Jantaro; Thailand	Amirul Ahat; Brunei	Hafiz Mahari; Malaysia
Tanding class A 45–50 kg	Niphon Jantaro; Thailand	Amirul Ahat; Brunei	Diyan Kristianto; Indonesia
Tanding class H 80–85 kg	Faizal Abdullah; Malaysia	Sakda Rungsombat; Thailand	Razif Moklas; Singapore
Tanding class H 80–85 kg	Faizal Abdullah; Malaysia	Sakda Rungsombat; Thailand	Trịnh Hải Vương; Vietnam

=== Women ===
Event	Gold	Silver	Bronze
Tunggal	Ni Luh Putu Spyanawati; Indonesia	Vũ Thị Thảo; Vietnam	Norleyermah Hj Raya; Brunei
Ganda	Indonesia; Ni Made Dwiyanti; Sang Ayu Ketut	Vietnam; Nguyễn Thị Bình; Vũ Thị Thảo	Malaysia; Maslinda Zakaria; Kamilah Sulong
Tanding class A 45–50 kg	Lê Thị Phi Nga; Vietnam	Rina Jordana Adnan; Malaysia	Emraida Asmad; Philippines
Tanding class A 45–50 kg	Lê Thị Phi Nga; Vietnam	Rina Jordana Adnan; Malaysia	Ria Puspita Sari; Indonesia
Tanding class D 60–65 kg	Ni Nyoman Suparniti; Indonesia	Siti Zuliza Omar; Brunei	Monruthai Bangsalad; Thailand
Tanding class D 60–65 kg	Ni Nyoman Suparniti; Indonesia	Siti Zuliza Omar; Brunei	Saiedah Said; Singapore

== Medal table ==
Rank	Nation	Gold	Silver	Bronze	Total
1	Indonesia (INA)	5	0	2	7
2	Vietnam (VIE)	1	4	1	6
3	Malaysia (MAS)	1	1	3	5
4	Thailand (THA)	1	1	1	3
5	Brunei (BRU)	0	2	2	4
6	Singapore (SIN)	0	0	2	2
7	Philippines (PHI)	0	0	1	1
Totals (7 entries)		8	8	12	28

== Results ==
=== Men ===
==== Tunggal ====
19 October

Rank	Athlete	Score
1st place, gold medalist(s)	I Gusti Ngurah Arya Yudha (INA)	457
2nd place, silver medalist(s)	Nguyễn Việt Anh (VIE)	450
3rd place, bronze medalist(s)	Khairul Bahrin Durahman (BRU)	449
4	Christopher Breguera (PHI)	444
5	Azri Abdullah (SIN)	443
6	Ahmad Saiful Shamsuddin (MAS)	441
7	Hamri Awaedao (THA)	430

==== Ganda ====
22 October

Rank	Team	Score
1st place, gold medalist(s)	Indonesia (INA); Dani Hamdani; Yusuf Effendi	576
2nd place, silver medalist(s)	Vietnam (VIE); Nguyễn Thanh Tùng; Trần Đức Nghĩa	562
3rd place, bronze medalist(s)	Malaysia (MAS); Hafiz Arif; Helmi Aziz	562
4	Brunei (BRU); Ratno Eddy; Abu Bakar Haji	557
5	Singapore (SIN); Khairul Arifin Sulong; Syarif Abdul Raziz	549
6	Philippines (PHI); Aldam Isdam; John Mark Coronel	529

==== Tanding 50 kg ====
Preliminary; 18 October
Hafiz Mahari (MAS)	5
Joe Marie Rivas (PHI)	0
Mohd Asadullah (SIN)	0
Niphon Jantaro (THA)	5
Lê Công Nghiệp (VIE)	0
Diyan Kristianto (INA)	5

Semifinals; 20 October
Hafiz Mahari (MAS)	1
Niphon Jantaro (THA)	4
Diyan Kristianto (INA)
Amirul Ahat (BRU)	KO

Final; 22 October
Niphon Jantaro (THA)	4
Amirul Ahat (BRU)	1

==== Tanding 85 kg ====
Preliminary; 18 October		Semifinals; 20 October		Final; 22 October
Sakda Rungsombat (THA)	3
Khairul Bahri Ali Umar (BRU)	2	Sakda Rungsombat (THA)	5
Razif Moklas (SIN)	3	Razif Moklas (SIN)	0
Pranoto (INA)	2			Sakda Rungsombat (THA)	1
Faizal Abdullah (MAS)	5			Faizal Abdullah (MAS)	4
Edwin Simacon (PHI)	0	Faizal Abdullah (MAS)	5
		Trịnh Hải Vương (VIE)	0

=== Women ===
==== Tunggal ====
22 October

Rank	Athlete	Score
1st place, gold medalist(s)	Ni Luh Putu Spyanawati (INA)	454
2nd place, silver medalist(s)	Vũ Thị Thảo (VIE)	449
3rd place, bronze medalist(s)	Norleyermah Hj Raya (BRU)	446
4	Rabiatul Adawiyah Yusak (SIN)	443
5	Suzy Sulaiman (MAS)	442
6	Analy Pinonggan (PHI)	438
7	Nurama Chedo (THA)	427

==== Ganda ====
19 October

Rank	Team	Score
1st place, gold medalist(s)	Indonesia (INA); Ni Made Dwiyanti; Sang Ayu Ketut	570
2nd place, silver medalist(s)	Vietnam (VIE); Nguyễn Thị Bình; Vũ Thị Thảo	562
3rd place, bronze medalist(s)	Malaysia (MAS); Maslinda Zakaria; Kamilah Sulong	535
4	Singapore (SIN); Norishah Anwar; Nordianawati Sadali	520

==== Tanding 50 kg ====
Preliminary; 18 October
Emraida Asmad (PHI)	5
Nur As Shikeen Amran (SIN)	0
Bunyaoon Phengwuek (THA)	0
Lê Thị Phi Nga (VIE)	5

Semifinals; 19 October
Emraida Asmad (PHI)	0
Rina Jordana Adnan (MAS)	5
Lê Thị Phi Nga (VIE)	5
Ria Puspita Sari (INA)	0

Final; 22 October
Rina Jordana Adnan (MAS)	0
Lê Thị Phi Nga (VIE)	5

==== Tanding 65 kg ====
Preliminary; 19 October		Semifinals; 20 October		Final; 22 October
Emy Latip (MAS)	0
Ni Nyoman Suparniti (INA)	5	Ni Nyoman Suparniti (INA)	5
Monruthai Bangsalad (THA)	5	Monruthai Bangsalad (THA)	0
Marie Charilou Rabino (PHI)	0			Ni Nyoman Suparniti (INA)	5
Lê Thị Hồng Ngoan (VIE)	0			Siti Zuliza Omar (BRU)	0
Saiedah Said (SIN)	5	Saiedah Said (SIN)	2
		Siti Zuliza Omar (BRU)	3
