= Jet ski at the 2008 Asian Beach Games =

- Venue: Nusa Dua
- Dates: 23–25 October 2008

Jet ski at the 2008 Asian Beach Games were held from 23 October to 25 October 2008 in Bali, Indonesia.

== Medalists ==
Event	Gold	Silver	Bronze
Runabout open	Ekachon Kingchansilp; Thailand	Apdun Dewiloh; Thailand	Rocky Soerapoetra; Indonesia
Runabout 800 superstock	Ali Al-Shamali; Kuwait	Sudapet Tansai; Thailand	Chokuthit Molee; Thailand
Runabout endurance open	Pichet Settura; Thailand	Veerapong Maneechom; Thailand	Temmy Fitramsyah Iskandar; Indonesia
Ski open	Arthit Wongpinta; Thailand	Chutchanun Siriwattanakul; Thailand	Irwansyah Adi Pratama; Indonesia

== Medal table ==
Rank	Nation	Gold	Silver	Bronze	Total
1	Thailand (THA)	3	4	1	8
2	Kuwait (KUW)	1	0	0	1
3	Indonesia (INA)	0	0	3	3
Totals (3 entries)		4	4	4	12

== Results ==
=== Runabout open ===
23–24 October

Rank	Athlete	Motor 1	Motor 2	Motor 3	Total
1st place, gold medalist(s)	Ekachon Kingchansilp (THA)	1	1	1	3
2nd place, silver medalist(s)	Apdun Dewiloh (THA)	2	3	2	7
3rd place, bronze medalist(s)	Rocky Soerapoetra (INA)	4	2	3	9
4	Martin Nugroho (INA)	3	4	4	11
—	Ali Al-Shamali (KUW)				DNS

=== Runabout 800 superstock ===
23–24 October

Rank	Athlete	Motor 1	Motor 2	Motor 3	Total
1st place, gold medalist(s)	Ali Al-Shamali (KUW)	1	1	1	3
2nd place, silver medalist(s)	Sudapet Tansai (THA)	2	2	4	8
3rd place, bronze medalist(s)	Chokuthit Molee (THA)	3	5	2	10
4	Aero Sutan Aswar (INA)	4	3	3	10
5	Glenn Aringga Nirwan (INA)	7	4	5	16

=== Runabout endurance open ===
25 October

Rank	Athlete	Score
1st place, gold medalist(s)	Pichet Settura (THA)	400
2nd place, silver medalist(s)	Veerapong Maneechom (THA)	380
3rd place, bronze medalist(s)	Temmy Fitramsyah Iskandar (INA)	368
4	Ali Al-Shamali (KUW)	360
5	Resya Ardiansyah (INA)	352
—	Samir Yazbek (LIB)	DNF

=== Ski open ===
23–24 October

Rank	Athlete	Motor 1	Motor 2	Motor 3	Total
1st place, gold medalist(s)	Arthit Wongpinta (THA)	2	2	1	5
2nd place, silver medalist(s)	Chutchanun Siriwattanakul (THA)	1	1	3	5
3rd place, bronze medalist(s)	Irwansyah Adi Pratama (INA)	3	3	2	8
4	Aero Sutan Aswar (INA)	4	4	4	12
