= Indonesia at the 2008 Asian Beach Games =

- IOC code: INA
- NOC: Indonesian Olympic Committee
- Website: www.nocindonesia.or.id (in English)

in Bali
- Competitors: 214 in 19 sports
- Medals Ranked 1st: Gold 23 Silver 8 Bronze 20 Total 51

Asian Beach Games appearances
- 2008; 2010; 2012; 2014; 2016; 2026

Indonesia competed in the 2008 Asian Beach Games, held in Bali, Indonesia from October 18 to October 26, 2008.

Indonesia sent a total of 214 athletes that competed on 19 sports.

== Medal summary ==
=== Medal table ===
Sport	Gold	Silver	Bronze	Total
Paragliding	7	2	2	11
Beach Pencak silat	5	0	2	7
Dragon boat	4	2	0	6
Surfing	3	2	4	9
Bodybuilding	2	0	0	2
Sailing	1	0	1	2
Beach volleyball	1	0	0	1
Beach sepak takraw	0	1	2	3
Beach wrestling	0	1	2	3
Jet ski	0	0	3	3
Beach kabaddi	0	0	1	1
Beach water polo	0	0	1	1
Marathon swimming	0	0	1	1
Woodball	0	0	1	1
Total	23	8	20	51

=== Medalists ===
Medal	Name	Sport	Event
Gold	Ni Nyoman Suparniti	Beach Pencak silat	Women's Tanding Class D
Gold	I Gusti Ngurah Arya Yudhapandita	Beach Pencak silat	Men's Tunggal
Gold	Ni Luh Putu Spyanawati	Beach Pencak silat	Women's Tunggal
Gold	Dani Hamdani; Muhammad Yusuf Efendi	Beach Pencak silat	Men's Ganda
Gold	Ni Made Dwi Yanti; Sang Ayu Ketut	Beach Pencak silat	Women's Ganda
Gold	Andi Ardiyansyah; Koko Prasetyo Darkuncoro	Beach volleyball	Men's
Gold	Arselawandi	Bodybuilding	Men's 60 kg
Gold	Syafrizaldi	Bodybuilding	Men's 75 kg
Gold	Dede Suryana	Surfing	Men's aerial
Gold	I Made Widiarta	Surfing	Men's shortboard
Gold	Nanang Suryana	Paragliding	Men's individual accuracy
Gold	Dyan Apriyani	Paragliding	Women's individual accuracy
Gold	Thomas Widyananto	Paragliding	Men's individual Cross-country
Gold	Milawati Sirin	Paragliding	Women's individual Cross-country
Gold	Oka Sulaksana	Sailing	Men's Mistral OD Heavy Weight
Gold	Buce Zeth Monim; Jaslin; Weri Pebrianto; Gandi; Rahman Aju; Andri Sugiarto; Sven Stuber; Diyono; Ahmad Supriadi; Isdori; Asep Hidayat; Didin Rusdiana; Indra Yulius; Kuat; Asnawir; Eka Octarianus; Nursalam; Japerry Siregar; Vines Kambay; Anwar Tarra; Husni Hatuina; Jhon Matulessy; Ikhwan Randi; Iwan Husin; Abdul Azis; Spens Stuber Mehue; Ajurahman; Hardony	Dragon boat	Men's 1000 m
Gold	Astri Dwijayanti; Nikmah Diana; Agustina Kabay; Itta Anggraini; Suhartati; Christina Kafolakari; Multi; Hartawan; Royani Rais; Salwiah; Sarce Aronggear; Hasnah; Masripah; Rasima; Yulanda Ester Entong; Suci Rahmayanti; Farida; Minawati; Siti Maryam; Yohana Yoce Yom; Since Lithasova Yom; Sere Pipit; Mintelda Ibo; Nurmila; Kanti Santyawati; Erni Sokoy	Dragon boat	Women's 1000 m
Gold	Astri Dwijayanti; Nikmah Diana; Agustina Kabay; Itta Anggraini; Suhartati; Christina Kafolakari; Multi; Hartawan; Royani Rais; Salwiah; Sarce Aronggear; Hasnah; Masripah; Rasima; Yulanda Ester Entong; Suci Rahmayanti; Farida; Minawati; Siti Maryam; Yohana Yoce Yom; Since Lithasova Yom; Sere Pipit; Mintelda Ibo; Nurmila; Kanti Santyawati; Erni Sokoy	Dragon boat	Women's 500 m
Gold	Astri Dwijayanti; Nikmah Diana; Agustina Kabay; Itta Anggraini; Suhartati; Christina Kafolakari; Multi; Hartawan; Royani Rais; Salwiah; Sarce Aronggear; Hasnah; Masripah; Rasima; Yulanda Ester Entong; Suci Rahmayanti; Farida; Minawati; Siti Maryam; Yohana Yoce Yom; Since Lithasova Yom; Sere Pipit; Mintelda Ibo; Nurmila; Kanti Santyawati; Erni Sokoy	Dragon boat	Women's 250 m
Gold	Teguh Maryanto; Nanang Sunarya; Acep Suparya; Tony Yudantoro Suwono; Thomas Widyananto	Paragliding	Men's team Cross-country
Gold	Lis Andriana; Dyan Apriyanti; Dian Rosnalia; Milawati Sirin; Nofrica Yanti	Paragliding	Women's team accuracy
Gold	Lis Andriana; Dyan Apriyanti; Dian Rosnalia; Milawati Sirin; Nofrica Yanti	Paragliding	Women's team Cross-country
Gold	I Made Widiarta; I Made Raditya Rondi; Dede Suryana; Made Adi Putra	Surfing	Mixed team
Silver	I Made Raditya	Surfing	Men's shortboard
Silver	Gea Yasniar	Surfing	Women's shortboard
Silver	Dian Rosnalia	Paragliding	Women's individual accuracy
Silver	Pahmi Pami Gunawan	Beach wrestling	Men's 65 kg
Silver	Indonesia Sepak Takraw Women's Team	Beach sepak takraw	Women's team
Silver	Buce Zeth Monim; Jaslin; Weri Pebrianto; Gandi; Rahman Aju; Andri Sugiarto; Sven Stuber; Diyono; Ahmad Supriadi; Isdori; Asep Hidayat; Didin Rusdiana; Indra Yulius; Kuat; Asnawir; Eka Octarianus; Nursalam; Japerry Siregar; Vines Kambay; Anwar Tarra; Husni Hatuina; Jhon Matulessy; Ikhwan Randi; Iwan Husin; Abdul Azis; Spens Stuber Mehue; Ajurahman; Hardony	Dragon boat	Men's 250 m
Silver	Buce Zeth Monim; Jaslin; Weri Pebrianto; Gandi; Rahman Aju; Andri Sugiarto; Sven Stuber; Diyono; Ahmad Supriadi; Isdori; Asep Hidayat; Didin Rusdiana; Indra Yulius; Kuat; Asnawir; Eka Octarianus; Nursalam; Japerry Siregar; Vines Kambay; Anwar Tarra; Husni Hatuina; Jhon Matulessy; Ikhwan Randi; Iwan Husin; Abdul Azis; Spens Stuber Mehue; Ajurahman; Hardony	Dragon boat	Men's 500m
Silver	Teguh Maryanto; Nanang Sunarya; Acep Suparya; Tony Yudantoro Suwono; Thomas Widyananto	Paragliding	Men's team accuracy
Bronze	Diyan Kristianto	Beach Pencak Silat	Men's Tanding Class A
Bronze	Ria Puspita Sari	Beach Pencak Silat	Women's Tanding Class A
Bronze	Made Adi Putra	Surfing	Men's aerial
Bronze	Husni Ridwan	Surfing	Men's longboard
Bronze	Wayan Widana	Surfing	Men's longboard
Bronze	Dewi Diah Rahayu	Surfing	Women's shortboard
Bronze	Rocky Soerapoetra	Jet ski	Runabout open
Bronze	Irwansyah Adi Pratama	Jet ski	Ski open
Bronze	Temmy Fitramsyah Iskandar	Jet ski	Runabout endurance
Bronze	Maximillian Manurung	Marathon swimming	Men's 10 km
Bronze	Teguh Maryanto	Paragliding	Men's individual Cross-country
Bronze	Milawati Sirin	Paragliding	Women's individual accuracy
Bronze	Rudi Haryanto	Beach wrestling	Men's 75 kg Men
Bronze	Nur Rusli	Beach wrestling	Men's 85 kg
Bronze	Ni Luh Putu Indrawathi; Ni Luh Putu Risstya; Ni Putu Soma Apriantini; Desak Made Agustin Dewi; Ni Komang Ariningsih; Ni Made Sridevi	Beach Kabaddi	Women
Bronze	Indonesia Sepak Takraw Men's Team	Beach sepak takraw	Men's team
Bronze	Indonesia Sepak Takraw Women Team	Beach sepak takraw	Women's regu
Bronze	Muhammad Zamri; Deni Novendra; Indrawan Ginting; Hendri Marcyano Raditya; Reza Aditya Putra; Heriansyah Saragih; Ridjkie Mulia Harahap; Maulana Bayu Herfianto	Beach water polo	Men
Bronze	Ario Dipo; Yoseph Udjulawa	Sailing	Hobie 16
Bronze	Ika Yulianingsih; Setyani Aris; Ismini; Sukiyanti; Kartini; Panji Rahayu Yeni	Woodball	Women's team
