= Beach handball at the 2008 Asian Beach Games =

- Venue: Mertasari Beach
- Dates: 18–25 October 2008

Beach handball at the 2008 Asian Beach Games were held from October 18 to October 25, 2008 in Bali, Indonesia.

== Medalists ==
Event	Gold	Silver	Bronze
Men	Pakistan; Nasr Ullah; Naseer Ahmed; Muhammad Uzair Atif; Muhammad Sohaib; Babar Sultan; Manzoor Ahmad; Muhammad Shahid Pervaiz; Azhar Khan; Muhammad Nadeem; Tahir Ali	Kuwait; Abdulaziz Balous; Hamad Al-Rashidi; Naser Bokhadra; Naseer Hasan; Mahdi Al-Qallaf; Meshari Al-Noubi; Sameh Al-Hajeri; Abdullah Ahmad; Saleh Al-Jaimaz; Meshari Al-Otaibi	Thailand; Kritsanawan Rienjan; Channarong Hunvun; Tanakorn Ekchiaochan; Lapat Chutan; Bulakorn Kongka; Sanit Iamphuchuai; Anek Sombunjit; Chainarong Srisong; Chumphon Chaiwut; Kaveewat Phachuen
Women	China; Xie Chenchen; Zhang Tianjie; Zhao Hui; Si Yan; Gong Yan; Hu Chunhui; Zhang Hongli	Thailand; Vanpen Sila; Duangjai Thaohom; Nadtaya Buaphan; Preeyanut Bureeruk; Thippawan Wongmak; Nualjan Supaphan; Pattarasiri Thanawat; Busarakam Sriruksa; Nantiya Chawdorn; Wongduean Sawatporn	Chinese Taipei; Chia Ling-hui; Chang Ya-wei; Chiu Yu-ting; Chen Yin-ling; Chu Chiu-en; Chen Te-jung; Hsu Ju-fang

== Medal table ==
Rank	Nation	Gold	Silver	Bronze	Total
1	China (CHN)	1	0	0	1
1	Pakistan (PAK)	1	0	0	1
3	Thailand (THA)	0	1	1	2
4	Kuwait (KUW)	0	1	0	1
5	Chinese Taipei (TPE)	0	0	1	1
Totals (5 entries)		2	2	2	6

== Results ==
=== Men ===
==== Preliminaries ====
===== Group A =====
Pos	Team	Pld	W	L	SF	SA	SD	Pts
1	Thailand	3	3	0	6	1	+5	6
2	Qatar	3	2	1	5	3	+2	4
3	Oman	3	1	2	3	4	−1	2
4	Japan	3	0	3	0	6	−6	0

Source: Official website

Date	Time		Score		Period 1	Period 2	SO
18 Oct	10:00	Japan	0–2	Qatar	8–13	8–11	
19 Oct	16:30	Thailand	2–0	Oman	16–13	18–16	
20 Oct	10:00	Oman	2–0	Japan	18–12	17–13	
20 Oct	16:30	Thailand	2–1	Qatar	18–9	11–13	6–5
21 Oct	15:30	Japan	0–2	Thailand	10–13	15–19	
22 Oct	14:30	Qatar	2–1	Oman	9–10	14–12	8–7

===== Group B =====
Pos	Team	Pld	W	L	SF	SA	SD	Pts
1	Pakistan	3	3	0	6	1	+5	6
2	Kuwait	3	2	1	5	2	+3	4
3	Jordan	3	1	2	2	5	−3	2
4	Indonesia	3	0	3	1	6	−5	0

Source: Official website

Date	Time		Score		Period 1	Period 2	SO
19 Oct	12:00	Jordan	0–2	Pakistan	9–14	14–23	
19 Oct	14:30	Indonesia	0–2	Kuwait	10–18	14–19	
20 Oct	14:30	Pakistan	2–0	Indonesia	23–16	23–10	
21 Oct	16:30	Jordan	0–2	Kuwait	4–9	12–14	
22 Oct	10:00	Indonesia	1–2	Jordan	16–15	18–21	6–7
22 Oct	16:30	Kuwait	1–2	Pakistan	5–20	14–10	1–4

==== Classification 5th–8th ====
===== 7th place match =====
Date	Time		Score		Period 1	Period 2	SO
24 Oct	15:00	Indonesia	1–2	Japan	14–16	15–13	6–7

===== 5th place match =====
Date	Time		Score		Period 1	Period 2	SO
24 Oct	17:00	Jordan	2–0	Oman	13–12	12–8	

==== Final round ====
Semifinals
23 October
Thailand	1
Kuwait	2
23 October
Pakistan	2
Qatar	1

Final
25 October
Kuwait	1
Pakistan	2
3rd place match
25 October
Thailand	2
Qatar	1

===== Semifinals =====
Date	Time		Score		Period 1	Period 2	SO
23 Oct	15:00	Thailand	1–2	Kuwait	14–13	8–10	4–5
23 Oct	17:00	Pakistan	2–1	Qatar	8–10	7–4	11–10

===== 3rd place match =====
Date	Time		Score		Period 1	Period 2	SO
25 Oct	10:00	Thailand	2–1	Qatar	15–16	16–11	12–10

===== Final =====
Date	Time		Score		Period 1	Period 2	SO
25 Oct	16:30	Kuwait	1–2	Pakistan	22–14	14–16	8–9

=== Women ===
==== Preliminaries ====
===== Group E =====
Pos	Team	Pld	W	L	SF	SA	SD	Pts
1	Chinese Taipei	3	3	0	6	0	+6	6
2	India	3	2	1	4	3	+1	4
3	Vietnam	3	1	2	2	4	−2	2
4	Indonesia	3	0	3	1	6	−5	0

Source: Official website

Date	Time		Score		Period 1	Period 2	SO
19 Oct	09:00	Chinese Taipei	2–0	Indonesia	20–8	20–7	
19 Oct	11:00	India	2–0	Vietnam	12–11	13–11	
20 Oct	09:00	Indonesia	1–2	India	12–18	15–9	4–5
21 Oct	09:00	Chinese Taipei	2–0	Vietnam	15–13	15–14	
22 Oct	09:00	India	0–2	Chinese Taipei	11–16	16–17	
22 Oct	11:00	Indonesia	0–2	Vietnam	10–16	13–17	

===== Group F =====
Pos	Team	Pld	W	L	SF	SA	SD	Pts
1	China	4	4	0	8	2	+6	8
2	Thailand	4	3	1	7	3	+4	6
3	Japan	4	2	2	6	4	+2	4
4	Jordan	4	1	3	2	7	−5	2
5	Hong Kong	4	0	4	1	8	−7	0

Source: Official website

Date	Time		Score		Period 1	Period 2	SO
18 Oct	09:00	Jordan	2–1	Hong Kong	4–14	15–8	5–4
18 Oct	11:00	Thailand	2–1	Japan	6–13	13–9	7–6
19 Oct	10:00	China	2–0	Hong Kong	8–7	17–8	
19 Oct	15:30	Jordan	0–2	Thailand	5–17	10–14	
20 Oct	11:00	Thailand	2–0	Hong Kong	14–9	19–15	
20 Oct	15:30	China	2–1	Japan	18–10	8–10	5–2
21 Oct	10:00	Jordan	0–2	Japan	6–14	9–18	
21 Oct	14:30	China	2–1	Thailand	8–13	10–6	5–2
22 Oct	12:00	Hong Kong	0–2	Japan	11–13	9–12	
22 Oct	15:30	Jordan	0–2	China	11–15	10–17	

==== Classification 5th–8th ====
===== 7th place match =====
Date	Time		Score		Period 1	Period 2	SO
24 Oct	14:00	Indonesia	0–2	Jordan	7–12	13–19	

===== 5th place match =====
Date	Time		Score		Period 1	Period 2	SO
24 Oct	16:00	Vietnam	2–0	Japan	16–13	16–15	

==== Final round ====
Semifinals
23 October
Chinese Taipei	0
Thailand	2
23 October
China	2
India	0

Final
25 October
Thailand	0
China	2
3rd place match
25 October
Chinese Taipei	2
India	0

===== Semifinals =====
Date	Time		Score		Period 1	Period 2	SO
23 Oct	14:00	Chinese Taipei	0–2	Thailand	12–15	12–16	
23 Oct	16:00	China	2–0	India	9–8	13–9	

===== 3rd place match =====
Date	Time		Score		Period 1	Period 2	SO
25 Oct	09:00	Chinese Taipei	2–0	India	10–8	13–9	

===== Final =====
Date	Time		Score		Period 1	Period 2	SO
25 Oct	15:30	Thailand	0–2	China	10–13	10–11	
