= Thailand at the 2008 Asian Beach Games =

- IOC code: THA
- NOC: National Olympic Committee of Thailand
- Website: www.olympicthai.or.th/eng (in English and Thai)

in Bali
- Medals Ranked 2nd: Gold 10 Silver 17 Bronze 10 Total 37

Asian Beach Games appearances
- 2008; 2010; 2012; 2014; 2016

Thailand competed in the 2008 Asian Beach Games, held in Bali, Indonesia from October 18 to October 26, 2008.

Thailand ranked 2nd in the said competition with 10 gold medals, 17 silver medals and 10 bronze medals.

== Medalists ==
| Medal | Name | Sport | Event |
|---|---|---|---|
| Gold | Niphon Jantaro | Beach Pencak Silat | Tanding Class A Men |
| Gold | Thailand Beach Sepaktakraw Men Team | Beach Sepaktakraw | Regu Men |
| Gold | Thailand Beach Sepaktakraw Men Team | Beach Sepaktakraw | Team Men |
| Gold | Thailand Beach Sepaktakraw Women Team | Beach Sepaktakraw | Team Women |
| Gold | Usa Tenpaksee; Jarunee Sannok | Beach Volleyball | Women |
| Gold | Sitthi Charoenrith | Bodybuilding | 80 kg Men |
| Gold | Pichet Settura | Jet Ski | Runabout Endurance |
| Gold | Ekachon Kingchansilp | Jet Ski | Runabout Open |
| Gold | Arthit Wongpinta | Jet Ski | Ski Open |
| Gold | Thailand 1 Sailing Team | Sailing | Hobie 16 |
| Silver | Thailand Beach basketball Women Team | Beach basketball | Women |
| Silver | Thailand Beach handball Women Team | Beach handball | Women |
| Silver | Thailand Beach Kabaddi Women Team | Beach Kabaddi | Women |
| Silver | Sakda Rungsombat | Beach Pencak Silat | Tanding Class H (men) |
| Silver | Thailand Beach Sepaktakraw Women Team | Beach Sepaktakraw | Regu Women |
| Silver | Yupa Phokongloy; Kamoltip Kulna | Beach Volleyball | Women |
| Silver | Somkhit Sumethowetchakun | Bodybuilding | 65 kg Men |
| Silver | Somsri Turinthaisong | Bodybuilding | 70 kg Men |
| Silver | Supadet Tansai | Jet Ski | Runabout 800 Open |
| Silver | Veerapong Maneechom | Jet Ski | Runabout Endurance |
| Silver | Apdun Dewiloh | Jet Ski | Runabout Open |
| Silver | Chutchanun Siriwattanakul | Jet Ski | Ski Open |
| Silver | Thailand Paragliding Women Team | Paragliding | Team Accuracy Women |
| Silver | Natthawut Paenyaem | Sailing | Laser 4.7 |
| Silver | Arun Homraruen | Windsurfing | Men - Mistral OD Heavy Weight |
| Silver | Thailand Woodball Men Team | Woodball | Team Men |
| Silver | Thailand Woodball Women Team | Woodball | Team Women |
| Bronze | Thailand Beach Handball Men Team | Beach Handball | Men |
| Bronze | Thailand Beach Kabaddi Men Team | Beach Kabaddi | Men |
| Bronze | Monruthai Bangsalad | Beach Pencak Silat | Tanding Class D (Women) |
| Bronze | Wanchat Jenpracha | Beach Wrestling | 85+Kg Men |
| Bronze | Thailand Dragon Boat Racing Women Team | Dragon Boat Racing | 250m Women |
| Bronze | Thailand Dragon Boat Racing Women Team | Dragon Boat Racing | 500m Women |
| Bronze | Chok-uthit Molee | Jet Ski | Runabout 800 Open |
| Bronze | Keerati Bualong | Sailing | Laser 4.7 |
| Bronze | Seksan Khunthong | Windsurfing | Men - Mistral OD Heavy Weight |
| Bronze | Navin Sinsart | Windsurfing | Men - Mistral OD Light Weight |

== Medal Tally by Sport ==
| Nation | Gold | Silver | Bronze | Total |
|---|---|---|---|---|
| Jet Ski | 3 | 4 | 1 | 8 |
| Beach Sepaktakraw | 3 | 1 | 0 | 4 |
| Bodybuilding | 1 | 2 | 0 | 3 |
| Beach Pencak Silat | 1 | 1 | 1 | 3 |
| Sailing | 1 | 1 | 1 | 3 |
| Beach Volleyball | 1 | 1 | 0 | 2 |
| Woodball | 0 | 2 | 0 | 2 |
| Windsurfing | 0 | 1 | 2 | 3 |
| Beach Handball | 0 | 1 | 1 | 2 |
| Beach Kabaddi | 0 | 1 | 1 | 2 |
| Beach Basketball | 0 | 1 | 0 | 1 |
| Paragliding | 0 | 1 | 0 | 1 |
| Dragon Boat Racing | 0 | 0 | 2 | 2 |
| Beach Wrestling | 0 | 0 | 1 | 1 |
| Totals (14 entries) | 10 | 17 | 10 | 37 |
