= Bangladesh at the 2008 Asian Beach Games =

- IOC code: BAN
- NOC: Bangladesh Olympic Association

in Bali
- Medals Ranked 24th: Gold 0 Silver 0 Bronze 1 Total 1

Asian Beach Games appearances
- 2008; 2010; 2012; 2014; 2016; 2026

Bangladesh competed at the 2008 Asian Beach Games held in Bali, Indonesia from October 18, 2008, to October 26, 2008. Bangladesh finished with 1 bronze medal.
