= Mongolia at the 2008 Asian Beach Games =

- IOC code: MGL
- NOC: Mongolian National Olympic Committee

in Bali
- Medals Ranked 19th: Gold 1 Silver 0 Bronze 0 Total 1

Asian Beach Games appearances
- 2008; 2010; 2012; 2014; 2016; 2026

Mongolia competed at the 2008 Asian Beach Games held in Bali, Indonesia from October 18, 2008, to October 26, 2008. Mongolia finished with 1 gold medal.
