= Pakistan at the 2008 Asian Beach Games =

- IOC code: PAK
- NOC: Pakistan Olympic Association

in Bali
- Medals Ranked 11th: Gold 2 Silver 2 Bronze 3 Total 7

Asian Beach Games appearances
- 2008; 2010; 2012; 2014; 2016; 2026

Pakistan competed at the 2008 Asian Beach Games held in Bali, Indonesia from October 18, 2008, to October 26, 2008. Pakistan finished with 2 gold medals, 2 silver medals, and 3 bronze medals and the 2 gold medals taken by M Taseen Imran.

== Medalists ==
Medal	Name	Sport	Event
Gold	Pakistan men's national handball team	Beach Handball	Men
Gold	Ghulam Haider	Beach Wrestling	65 kg
Silver	Pakistan national kabaddi team	Beach Kabaddi	Men
Silver	Muhammad Ali	Beach Wrestling	75 kg
Bronze	Usman Majeed	Beach Wrestling	85 kg
Bronze	Muhammad Taseen	Beach Wrestling	+85 kg
Bronze	Muhammad Imran Qureshi	Bodybuilding	75 kg Prejudge

== Medal Tally by Sport ==
Nation	Gold	Silver	Bronze	Total
Beach wrestling	1	1	2	4
Beach handball	1	0	0	1
Beach kabaddi	0	1	0	1
Bodybuilding	0	0	1	1
Totals (4 entries)	2	2	3	7
