= Macau at the 2008 Asian Beach Games =

- IOC code: MAC
- NOC: Macau Sports and Olympic Committee

in Bali
- Medals Ranked 24th: Gold 0 Silver 0 Bronze 1 Total 1

Asian Beach Games appearances
- 2008; 2010; 2012; 2014; 2016

Macau competed at the 2008 Asian Beach Games held in Bali, Indonesia from October 18, 2008, to October 26, 2008. Macau finished with 1 bronze medal.
