= 2008 Asian Beach Games =

Multi-sport event in Bali, Indonesia

1st Asian Beach Games Pesta Olahraga Pantai Asia Pertama
- Logo of the 2008 Asian Beach Games.
- Host city: Bali, Indonesia
- Motto: Inspire the World
- Nations: 41
- Athletes: 1,665
- Events: 71 in 19 sports
- Opening: 18 October
- Closing: 26 October
- Opened by: Susilo Bambang Yudhoyono; President of Indonesia
- Athlete's Oath: Andi Ardiansyah
- Judge's Oath: Pergunan Tarigan
- Torch lighter: Agus Salim; Taufik Hidayat; Oka Sulaksana
- Main venue: Garuda Wisnu Kencana Cultural Park
- Website: bali2008.com

The 2008 Asian Beach Games or ABG 2008 (Indonesian: Pesta Olahraga Pantai Asia 2008, Pesta Olahraga Pantai Asia Dua Ribu Delapan), officially the 1st Asian Beach Games (Indonesian: Pesta Olahraga Pantai Asia Pertama) and commonly as Bali 2008 (Indonesian: Bali 2008, Bali Dua Ribu Delapan), the inaugural Asian Beach Games, was held in Bali, Indonesia, from 18 to 26 October 2008. The opening ceremony was held in the Garuda Wisnu Kencana Cultural Park in Nusa Dua.

== Organisation ==
=== Bidding process ===
There was no bidding process for Bali to host the games. Although six other countries showed an interest, Bali was chosen by acclamation.

It was the second time that Indonesia had hosted an Asia-level multi-sport event, after Jakarta held the 1962 Asian Games.

=== Logo ===
The official logo of the games represents the water element that embodies the sporting event.

The shining sun comes from the emblem of the Olympic Council of Asia (OCA) and represents its vital role in Asia's sport development and the spreading energy created by the solidarity of the OCA. The selection of the light and deep-blue effects represents the color of Balinese waters. The two vertical lines represent two pura (Balinese Hindu temple), an image of the gate to a Balinese house of worship which signifies the ultimate hospitality of the Bali society in honouring and welcoming people from all over Asia. The two big waves represent the commitment as well as the enthusiasm of the host city to holding the first Asian Beach Games.

The letters "BALI 2008" are in red to show the spirit of sportsmanship and the typeface selection emphasizes the pride of all athletes competing in Bali.

=== Mascot ===
Official mascot, jalak Bali the Bali starling

The official mascot of the First Asian Beach Games was the Bali starling (Leucopsar rothschildi), locally known as "jalak Bali", the official mascot of Bali and a bird species endemic to the island.

The bird symbolizes Bali with all its uniqueness and serves as a reminder that the bird, like Bali, is beautiful, yet sacred. It is therefore apt that the official mascot of Bali was chosen as the official mascot for the first Bali Asian Beach Games.

=== Venues ===
There were five venues for this games.

Venue	Sports
Kuta Beach	Bodybuilding, dragon boat, surfing
Nusa Dua - Benoa	3x3 basketball, beach kabaddi, pencak silat, water polo, beach wrestling, jet ski, paragliding, beach woodball
Sanur Beach	Beach sepak takraw, beach volleyball
Mertasari Beach	Beach handball, beach soccer, Open water swimming, triathlon
Serangan Island	Sailing

=== Sponsorship ===
Sponsors include Swatch (official timekeeper and information system provider), Carisbrook (official wardrobe), Pertamina (Indonesian state-owned oil company), Panasonic and Samsung.

=== Broadcasting ===
A joint venture between Host Broadcast Services and IMG Media named the International Games Broadcast Services (IGBS) served as the games' host broadcaster. This was the first sporting event broadcast by the company as it previously broadcast the Doha 2006 Asian Games under the name Doha Asian Games Broadcast Services (DAGBS).

== Torch relay ==
The Bali Asian Beach Games Torch Relay started on 8 October 2008 at Mrapen in Grobogan, Central Java, famous for its eternal flame. The flame was lit with the aid of natural gas.

From Mrapen, the torch was carried to Semarang, the capital city of Central Java, where the torch was carried to the Governor Office by Indonesia's famous sprinter, Suryo Agung Wibowo.

On 9 October 2008, the torch arrived in Jakarta. On the next day, the torch was paraded from the City Hall to Indonesia's Minister of Youth and Sport Office, and finally arrived at the Istana Merdeka to be given to President Susilo Bambang Yudhoyono.

On 10 October 2008, the torch headed to Bali for a nine-day inland tour across ten regions (one city and nine regencies).

More than 500 people (45 per district) were involved in the torch relay as torch bearers. They came from the sports world as local, national and international athletes, coaches and officials. More than 2,000 people participated in the parade.

The journey was a showcase of Indonesian culture to international audiences, especially Balinese traditional art, dance and music.

== Highlights ==
The opening ceremony was held in the Garuda Wisnu Kencana, a great monumental cultural park in Nusa Dua, the most luxurious region in Bali.

President Yudhoyono officially opened the games when the torch reached the Garuda Wisnu Kencana.

The ceremony highlighted Indonesian cultural arts and included international performers such as Mark Lazarro from India and Christian Bautista from the Philippines, as well as famous Indonesian singers and composers, such as Reza Artamevia, Andre Hehanusa and Erwin Gutawa.

Andre Hehanusa, Christian Bautista and Mark Lazarro sang "To Be One" while the Indonesian female singer, Reza Artamevia, performed the games anthem, "Together We Inspire the World".

About 41 country leaders and several very important persons, including members of the British royal family and the Qatari Royal Family, attended the opening ceremony.

The 2008 Asian Beach Games were closed by Indonesia's Vice President, Jusuf Kalla, on 26 October 2008.

A countdown clock cost Rp800 million (US$87,521) was situated at Lumintang Field.

== Sports ==
- 3x3 basketball (2)
- Beach handball (2)
- Beach kabaddi (2)
- Beach sepak takraw (4)
- Beach soccer (1)
- Beach volleyball (2)
- Beach water polo (1)
- Beach woodball (4)
- Beach wrestling (4)
- Bodybuilding (6)
- Dragon boat (6)
- Jet ski (4)
- Open water swimming (4)
- Paragliding (8)
- Pencak silat (8)
- Sailing (2)
- Surfing (5)
- Triathlon (2)
- Windsurfing (4)

== Participating nations ==
41 Asian countries participated in the games.

- Afghanistan
- Bahrain
- Bangladesh
- Brunei
- Cambodia
- China
- Chinese Taipei
- Hong Kong
- India
- Indonesia (214)
- Iran (10)
- Japan
- Jordan
- Kazakhstan
- Kuwait
- Kyrgyzstan
- Laos
- Lebanon
- Macau
- Malaysia
- Maldives (10)
- Mongolia
- Myanmar
- Nepal (5)
- North Korea (2)
- Oman
- Pakistan
- Palestine
- Philippines
- Qatar
- Singapore
- South Korea
- Sri Lanka
- Syria
- Tajikistan
- Thailand
- Timor-Leste (18)
- United Arab Emirates
- Uzbekistan
- Vietnam
- Yemen

== Calendar ==
OC	Opening ceremony	●	Event competitions	1	Event finals	CC	Closing ceremony

October 2008	18th Sat	19th Sun	20th Mon	21st Tue	22nd Wed	23rd Thu	24th Fri	25th Sat	26th Sun	Gold medals
3x3 basketball							●	●	2	2
Beach handball	●	●	●	●	●	●	●	2		2
Beach kabaddi		●	●	●	2					2
Beach sepak takraw	●	●	●	2		●	●	2		4
Beach soccer	●	●	●	●	●	●	●	●	1	1
Beach volleyball	●	●	●	●	●	●	●	●	2	2
Beach water polo		●	●	●	1					1
Beach woodball	●	●	●	2	2					4
Beach wrestling							2	2		4
Bodybuilding		●	6							6
Dragon boat		2	2	2						6
Jet ski						●	3	1		4
Open water swimming								2	2	4
Paragliding			●	●	●	4	4			8
Pencak silat	●	2	●		6					8
Sailing				●	●		●	6		6
Surfing		1	1	1	1	1				5
Triathlon									2	2
Total gold medals		5	9	7	12	5	9	15	9	71
Ceremonies	OC								CC	
October 2008	18th Sat	19th Sun	20th Mon	21st Tue	22nd Wed	23rd Thu	24th Fri	25th Sat	26th Sun	Gold medals

== Medal table ==
* Host nation (Indonesia)

Rank	Nation	Gold	Silver	Bronze	Total
1	Indonesia (INA)*	23	8	20	51
2	Thailand (THA)	10	17	10	37
3	China (CHN)	6	10	7	23
4	South Korea (KOR)	4	7	10	21
5	Japan (JPN)	3	3	3	9
6	Hong Kong (HKG)	3	3	2	8
7	India (IND)	3	0	2	5
8	Vietnam (VIE)	2	5	3	10
9	Myanmar (MYA)	2	3	0	5
10	Malaysia (MAS)	2	2	6	10
11	Chinese Taipei (TPE)	2	2	3	7
11	Pakistan (PAK)	2	2	3	7
13	Syria (SYR)	2	0	0	2
14	Kuwait (KUW)	1	2	0	3
15	Kazakhstan (KAZ)	1	1	2	4
16	United Arab Emirates (UAE)	1	1	1	3
17	Singapore (SIN)	1	0	2	3
18	Afghanistan (AFG)	1	0	1	2
19	Mongolia (MGL)	1	0	0	1
19	Oman (OMA)	1	0	0	1
21	Philippines (PHI)	0	2	8	10
22	Brunei (BRU)	0	2	3	5
23	Jordan (JOR)	0	1	0	1
24	Bahrain (BRN)	0	0	1	1
24	Bangladesh (BAN)	0	0	1	1
24	Macau (MAC)	0	0	1	1
24	Maldives (MDV)	0	0	1	1
Totals (27 entries)		71	71	90	232
