= Jordan at the 2008 Asian Beach Games =

- IOC code: JOR
- NOC: Jordan Olympic Committee

in Bali
- Medals Ranked 23rd: Gold 0 Silver 1 Bronze 0 Total 1

Asian Beach Games appearances
- 2008; 2010; 2012; 2014; 2016; 2026

Jordan competed at the 2008 Asian Beach Games held in Bali, Indonesia from October 18, 2008, to October 26, 2008. Jordan finished with 1 silver medal.
