= Singapore at the 2008 Asian Beach Games =

- IOC code: SIN
- NOC: Singapore National Olympic Council
- Website: www.singaporeolympics.com (in English)

in Bali
- Medals Ranked 17th: Gold 1 Silver 0 Bronze 2 Total 3

Asian Beach Games appearances
- 2008; 2010; 2012; 2014; 2016

Singapore competed at the 2008 Asian Beach Games, the inaugural Asian Beach Games, held in Bali, Indonesia from 18 October to 26 October 2008.

Singapore ranked 17th in the medal tally with one gold medal and two bronze medals.

== Medallists ==
Medal	Name	Sport	Event
Gold	Yeow Gim Ng	Woodball	Men
Bronze	Saideah Said	Beach Pencak Silat	Tanding Class D (Women)
Bronze	Mohamed Razif Moklas	Beach Pencak Silat	Tanding Class A (Men)
