= Vietnam at the 2008 Asian Beach Games =

- IOC code: VIE
- NOC: Vietnam Olympic Committee
- Website: www.voc.org.vn (in Vietnamese and English)

in Bali
- Medals Ranked 8th: Gold 2 Silver 5 Bronze 3 Total 10

Asian Beach Games appearances
- 2008; 2010; 2012; 2014; 2016

Vietnam competed in the 2008 Asian Beach Games, held in Bali, Indonesia from October 18 to October 26, 2008.

Vietnam ranked 8th in the said competition with 2 gold medals, 5 silver medals and 3 bronze medals.

== Medallists ==
Medal	Name	Sport	Event	Date
Gold	Nguyễn Văn Lâm	Bodybuilding	Men's team	20 October
Gold	Lê Thị Phi Nga	Pencak silat	Women's Tanding class A 45–50 kg	22 October
