= Malaysia at the 2008 Asian Beach Games =

- IOC code: MAS
- NOC: Olympic Council of Malaysia
- Website: www.olympic.org.my (in English)

in Bali
- Medals Ranked 10th: Gold 2 Silver 2 Bronze 6 Total 10

Asian Beach Games appearances
- 2008; 2010; 2012; 2014; 2016

Malaysia competed at the 2008 Asian Beach Games held in Bali, Indonesia from 18 October 2008 to 26 October 2008. Malaysia finished with 2 gold medals, 2 silver medals, and 6 bronze medals.

== Medallists ==
| Medal | Name | Sport | Event | Date |
|---|---|---|---|---|
| Gold | Abdullah Ahmad; Arifin Mamat; Azmi Ahmad; Jamil Mat Ali; Sharnuddin Ngah; Syed Bakar Osman | Beach woodball | Men's team | 21 October |
| Gold | Faizal Abdullah | Pencak silat | Men's tanding 80-85 kg | 22 October |
| Silver | Arifin Mamat | Beach woodball | Men's singles | 22 October |
| Silver | Rina Jordana Adnan | Pencak silat | Women's tanding 45-50 kg | 22 October |
| Bronze | Kamilah Sulong; Maslinda Zakaria | Pencak silat | Women's ganda | 19 October |
| Bronze | Mohd Hafiz Mahari | Pencak silat | Men's tanding 45-50 kg | 20 October |
| Bronze | Syed Bakar Osman | Beach woodball | Men's singles | 22 October |
| Bronze | Mohd Hafiz Arif; Mohd Helmi Aziz | Pencak silat | Men's ganda | 22 October |
| Bronze | | Beach sepaktakraw | Men's regu | 24 October |
| Bronze | Heh Boon Pin; Kuek Tian Yuan; Sua Chee Huat; Te Kok Lim | 3-on-3 basketball | Men's tournament | 26 October |
