= Nusa Dua =

Resort area in Bali, Indonesia

Coordinates: 08°48′09″S 115°13′39″E

Location in Badung Regency

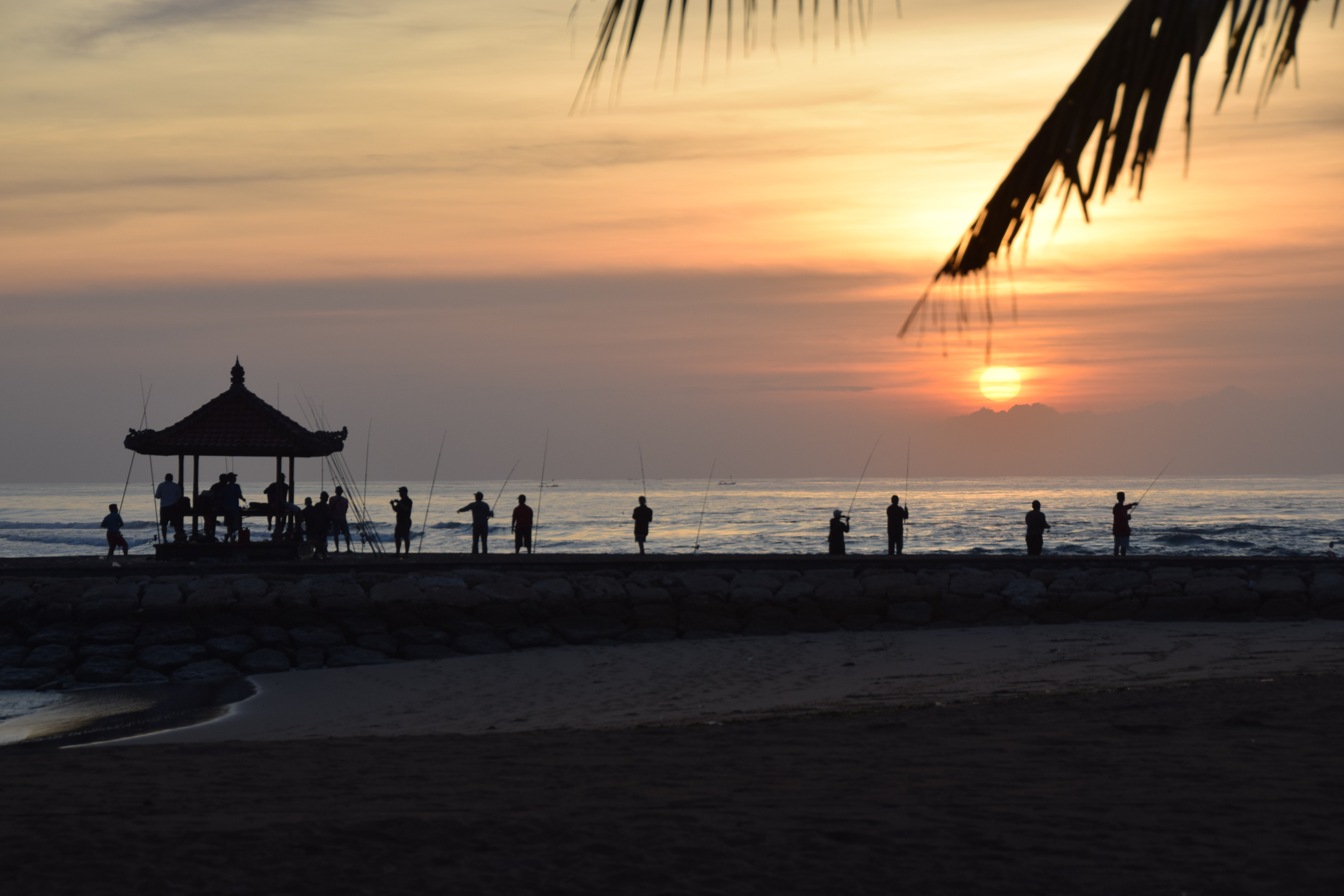
Fishermen from Bali

Nusa Dua is a resort area built in the 1970s in the southern part of Bali, Indonesia. Known as an enclave of large five-star resorts, it covers 350 hectares of land and encloses more than 20 resorts. It is located 22 kilometers from Denpasar, the provincial capital of Bali, and is administered as part of Benoa urban village (kelurahan) in South Kuta District of Badung Regency. Nusa Dua means two islands (nusa 'island', dua 'two'), because there are two islands in the bay of the Indonesia Tourism Development Corporation (ITDC) area. On the southern side lies Peninsula Island, and on the northern side lies Nusa Dharma Island, which is smaller but shadier, and which contains the Pura/Temple Nusa Dharma.

The core area of ITDC Nusa Dua is a gated community. There are security checkpoints, and visitors are charged a fee to enter.

== Points of interest ==
=== Geger Beach ===
Geger Beach is located in Sawangan, about 3 kilometers from the southern area of Nusa Dua. The sea there is calm, which allows farmers to grow seaweed in the area, as well as being an attractive place for tourists to swim.

=== Water Blow ===
Water Blow is located in the ITDC district where large waves of sea water from the Indian Ocean continually crash against the jagged limestone edges of a cliff. The water blow is the outcome of the narrowing crag below the cliff face that channels irregular surges of water that can reach several meters high, up to 30 meters high from its base following strong currents. It only occurs at high tide. The area provides a 240-degree lookout and the tormented shapes of volcanic rock make for a dramatic seascape. The site is bordered by guardrails and there is a small entrance fee.

=== Tanjung Benoa ===
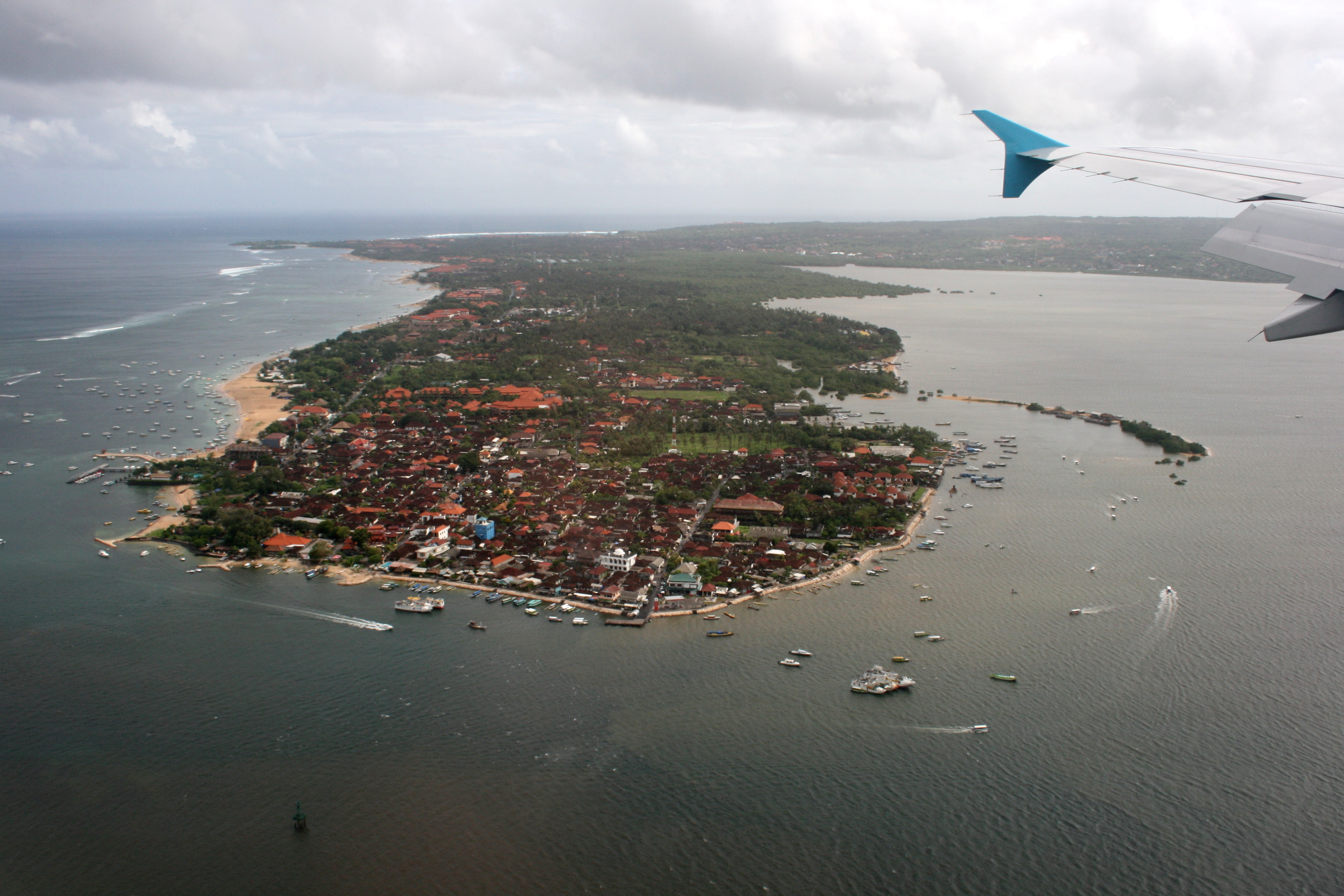
The peninsula of Tanjung Benoa, with the village of Benoa in the foreground and Nusa Dua in the background

Immediately north of the Nusa Dua enclave is the peninsula of Tanjung Benoa, which forms its own subdistrict of the same name. The original Balinese village of Benoa is located in this place, and to this day, colloquial usage of "Benoa" only refers to this place. A multi-denominational area, it includes a mosque, and Chinese and Hindu temples close to each other. Much of the beach's sand was washed away following the mining of the nearby barrier reef for construction materials. The hotels in the area are generally cheaper than the ones in Nusa Dua.

Benoa Port, also located there, was previously used for yachts and small ships. In December 2012, it became the Benoa Cruise International Terminal's turnaround port, serving as both an embarkation and a debarkation point for cruise passengers. As a turnaround port, tourists can arrive or leave Benoa Port by either plane or cruise ship.

On December 26, 2012, the Bali Governor signed a permit to utilize, develop, and manage the Benoa Bay area. 838 hectares reclaimed by PT Tirta Wahana Bali International will be used for luxury tourist facilities such as hotels, villas, apartments, an international hospital, and entertainment centers such as a Disneyland-like theme park.

== Coral restoration project ==
Nusa Dua is one of Bali's five sites benefiting from the largest coral restoration projects in the world (as of 2021): the Indonesian Coral Reef Garden (ICRG) intends to install altogether just under one million structural units. The project is funded by the Maritime Affairs and Fisheries Ministry, to the tune of $7.5 million. The final section of the project took place in the south of Nusa Dua, with a field survey for suitability of location carried out in November–December 2020. 1,000 local people, who had lost their jobs due to the COVID-19 pandemic and subsequent lag in tourism, were hired to build and instal 8,000 steel pipes, each 2 metres (6.5 feet) long, as substructures for coral gardens; that task was completed in October 2021.

This project also aims at reducing unemployement by planning for supervision and maintenance work of the sites, an undertaking that corresponds to the largest and more costly part of reef regeneration. Long-term monitoring has so far been implemented only for very few such operations, and is required to build a workable database needed to increase general knowledge on the process and increase success for future coral projects. Tries Razak, from Java's IPB University, explains in 2021 that "Growing coral is not growing trees, where you plant it and it will grow. The science is still very fuzzy. It might be successful in one spot but two metres away, the hydro-dynamic factors or supply of larvae will be slightly different and it won't work there. And as most of the restoration projects in Indonesia are being done without preliminary studies, artificial reefs are not planted in places where they are needed most."

== Hotels and resorts ==
In 1983, the Bali Tourism Development Corporation (BTDC), the ITDC's predecessor, opened Nusa Dua's first hotel, the Nusa Dua Beach Hotel & Spa. Originally operated by the government-owned Aerowisata, it is currently operated by PT Sejahtera Indoco on behalf of Sultan Hassanal Bolkiah of Brunei, who bought the property in 1990. Today, Nusa Dua has over two dozen, mostly five-star, resorts. The area is best known for its large concentration of international chain hotels, with Marriott International managing nine hotels through its Autograph Collection, Courtyard, Marriott Vacation Club, Renaissance, St. Regis, The Luxury Collection, The Ritz-Carlton, and Westin brands, Accor managing three hotels through its Mercure, Novotel, and Sofitel brands, Hilton Worldwide managing two hotels through its Conrad and Hilton brands, and Meliá Hotels International managing two hotels through its Meliá and Sol brands. There are also properties managed by Aman Resorts, Club Med, Holiday Inn, Hyatt, Kempinski, and Santika Indonesia Hotels & Resorts.

Eight of the ten largest hotels in Bali are located in Nusa Dua. The 636-room Grand Hyatt Bali was Bali's largest hotel when it first opened in 1991. It is still the island's largest single-branded hotel, as the larger Ayana Resort Bali in Jimbaran technically consists of four separate hotels.

== Image gallery ==
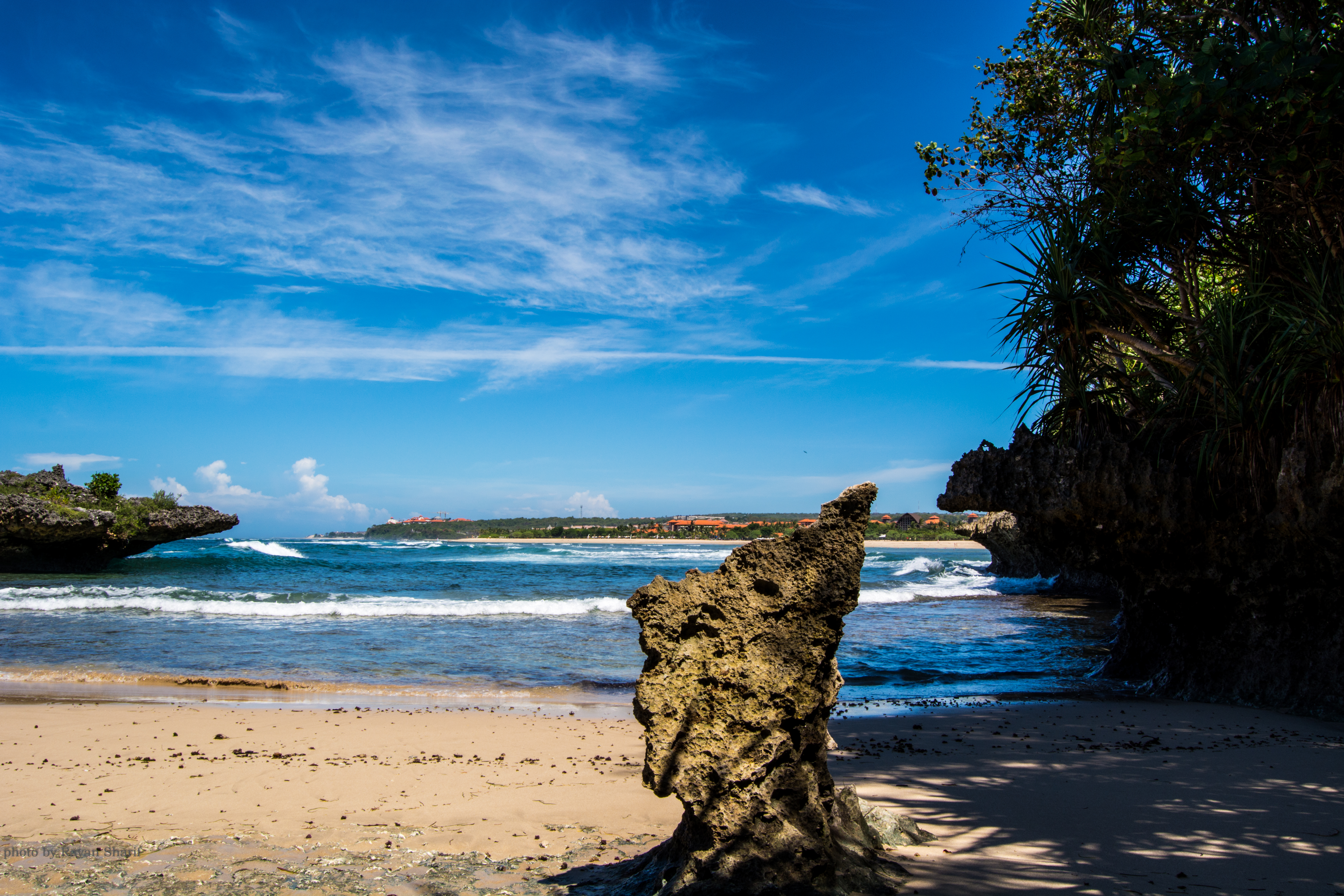
Nusa Dua beach

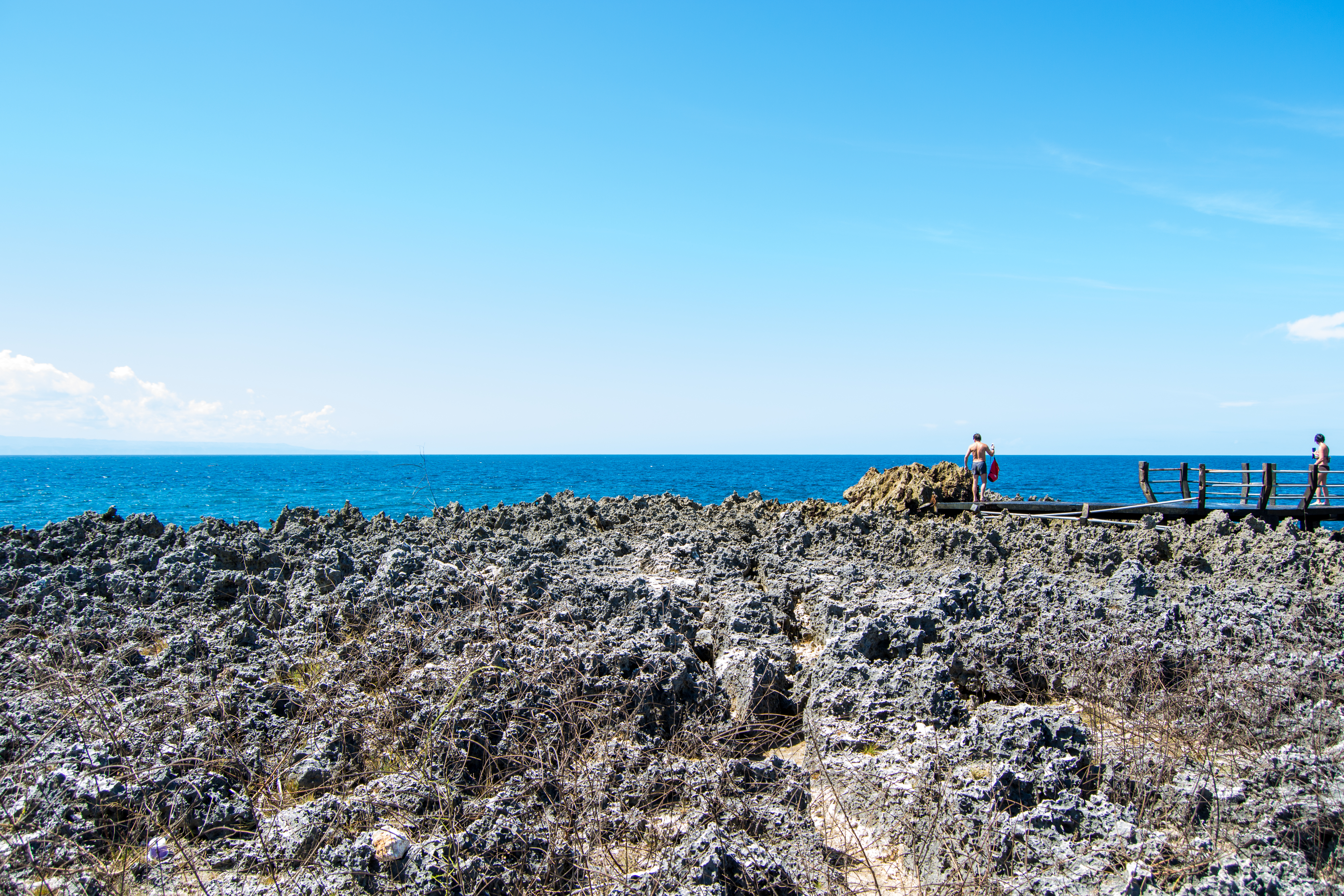
Nusa Dua peninsula cliff overlooking the Indian Ocean

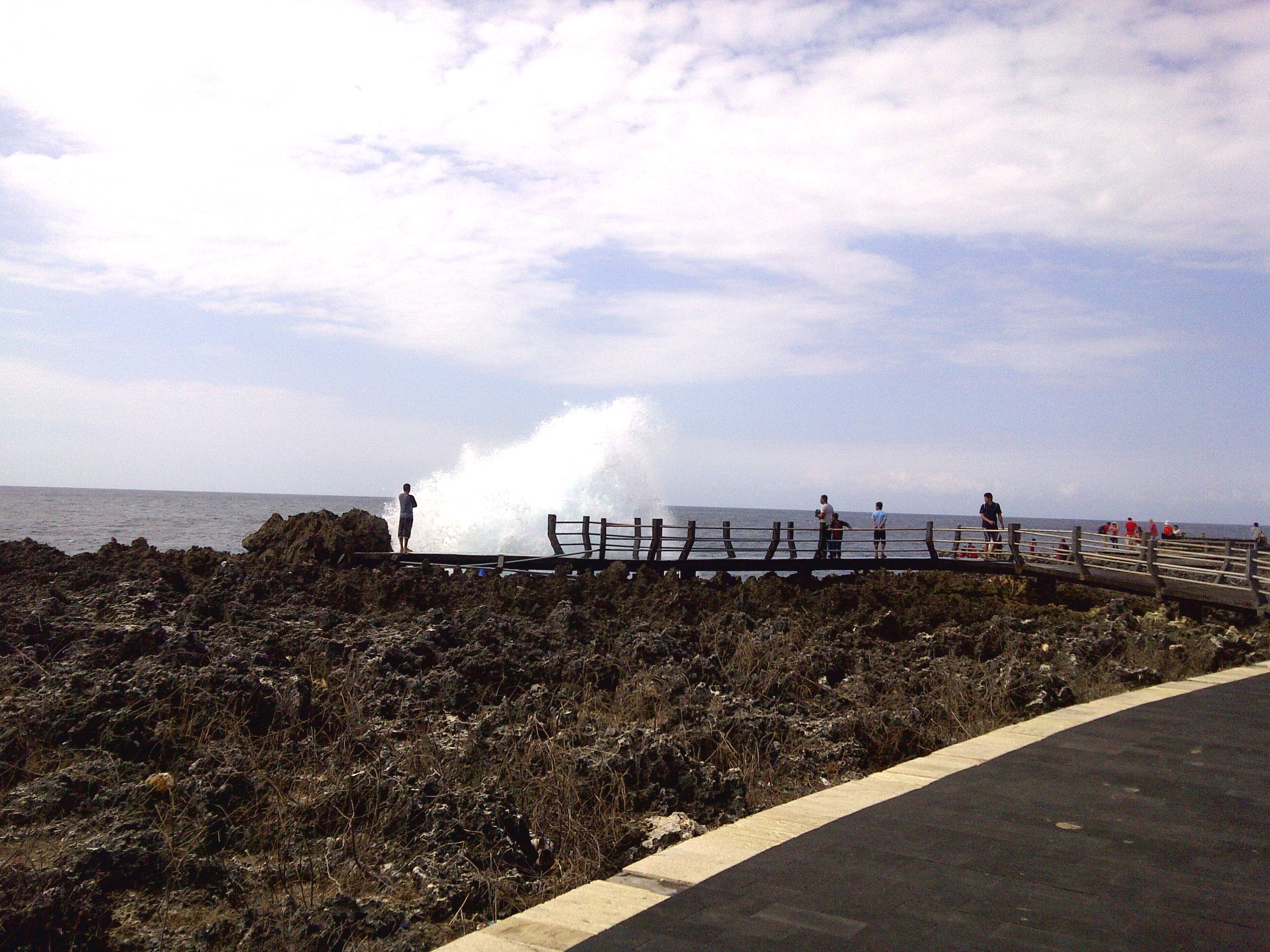
Geyser-like sea wave at one of two islets in Nusa Dua

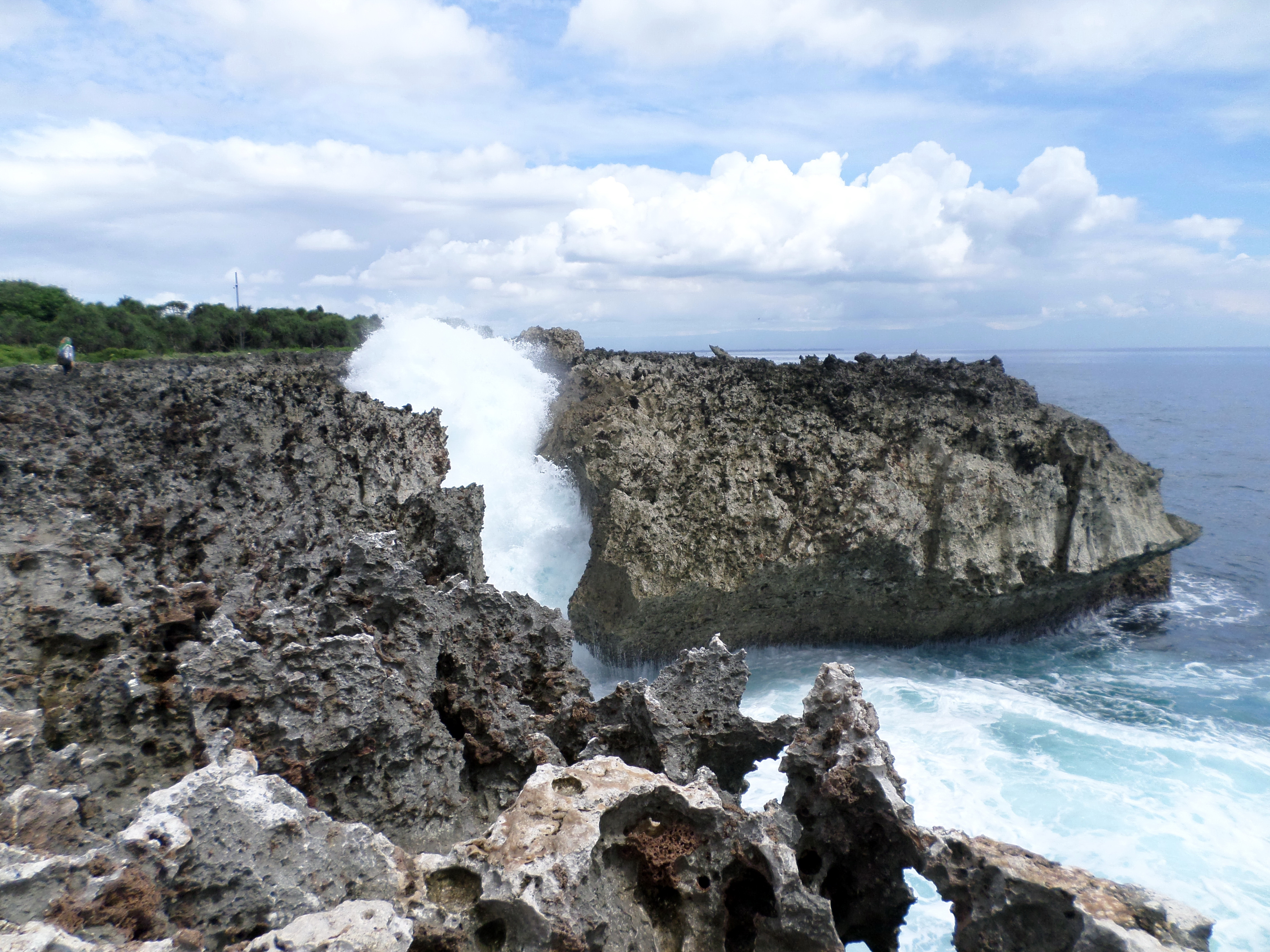
The same, showing the rock funnel

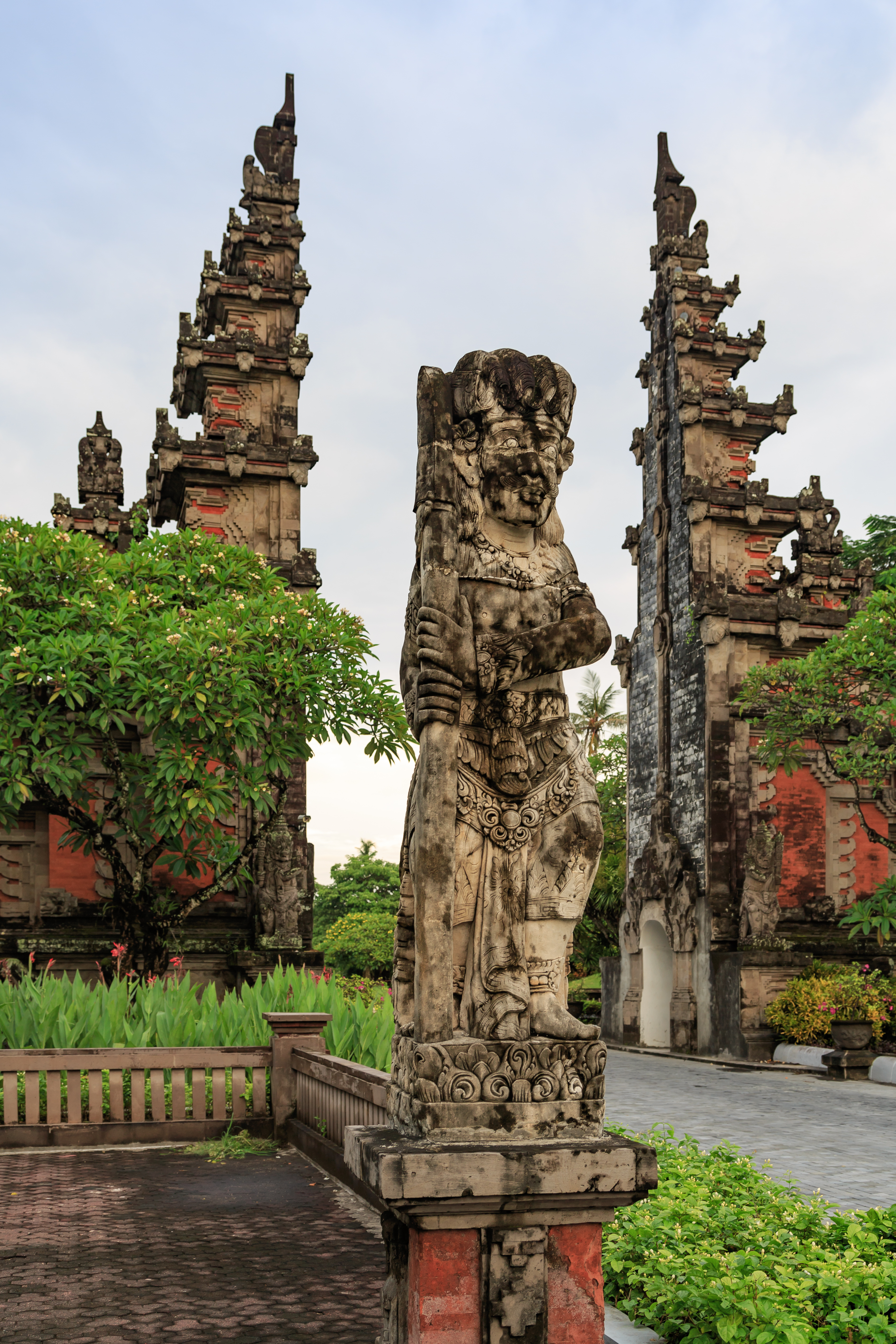
Nusa Dua entrance gate

== See also ==
- Jimbaran
- Pecatu

== Bibliography ==
- Van Bochove, G. (November 1985). "Coastal erosion problems at Nusa Dua Beach, Bali". repository.tudelft.nl. Indonesian Ministry of Public Works.
