= Philippines at the 2008 Asian Beach Games =

- IOC code: PHI
- NOC: Philippine Olympic Committee
- Website: www.olympic.ph (in English)

in Bali
- Medals Ranked 21st: Gold 0 Silver 2 Bronze 8 Total 10

Asian Beach Games appearances
- 2008; 2010; 2012; 2014; 2016; 2026

Philippines competed in the 2008 Asian Beach Games, held in Bali, Indonesia from October 18 to October 26, 2008.

The said country ranked 21st in the said competition with only 2 silver medals and 8 bronze medals.

== Medalists ==
=== Silver ===
No.	Medal	Name	Sport	Event
1	Silver	Luke Richard Thomas Landrigan	Surfing	Men's Longboard
2	Silver	Joseph Tolentino; Arthur dela Cruz; Papot Paredes; Sam Marata	3x3 Basketball	Men's Team

=== Bronze ===
No.	Medal	Name	Sport	Event
1	Bronze	Emraida Asmad	Pencak Silat	Women's Tanding Class A (45-50kg)
2	Bronze	Philippines	Beach sepaktakraw	Women's Regu Team
3	Bronze	Alex Sumagaysay; Perlito Idorot; Rami Llano; Ruperto Sabijon; Ric Nacional; Suhod Hakim; Cresanto Pabulayan; Junrey Dayumat; Romy John Dionio; Joemar Ocquiana; Diomedes Manalo; Ricky Sardena; Rolando Isidro; Romel Donesa; Salvador Sumagaysay; Joseph Magno; Raymond Morales; Ambrocio Gontinas; Jose Ijalo; Jesus Asok; Usman Anterola; Roland Tan	Dragon boat	Men's 250m
4	Bronze	Alex Sumagaysay; Perlito Idorot; Rami Llano; Ruperto Sabijon; Ric Nacional; Suhod Hakim; Cresanto Pabulayan; Junrey Dayumat; Romy John Dionio; Joemar Ocquiana; Diomedes Manalo; Ricky Sardena; Rolando Isidro; Romel Donesa; Salvador Sumagaysay; Joseph Magno; Raymond Morales; Ambrocio Gontinas; Jose Ijalo; Jesus Asok; Usman Anterola; Roland Tan	Dragon boat	Men's 500m
5	Bronze	Alex Sumagaysay; Perlito Idorot; Rami Llano; Ruperto Sabijon; Ric Nacional; Suhod Hakim; Cresanto Pabulayan; Junrey Dayumat; Romy John Dionio; Joemar Ocquiana; Diomedes Manalo; Ricky Sardena; Rolando Isidro; Romel Donesa; Salvador Sumagaysay; Joseph Magno; Raymond Morales; Ambrocio Gontinas; Jose Ijalo; Jesus Asok; Usman Anterola; Roland Tan	Dragon boat	Men's 1000m
6	Bronze	Carlito Nogalo	Surfing	Men's Shortboard
7	Bronze	Marianita Alcala	Surfing	Women's Shortboard
8	Bronze	Dionisio Espejon; Luke Richard Thomas Landrigan; Carlito Nogalo; Nildie Rietenbach	Surfing	Mixed Team

=== Multiple ===
Name	Sport	Gold	Silver	Bronze	Total
Luke Richard Landrigan	Surfing	0	1	1	2
Carlito Nogalo	Surfing	0	0	2	2
Alex Sumagaysay; Perlito Idorot; Rami Llano; Ruperto Sabijon; Ric Nacional; Suhod Hakim; Cresanto Pabulayan; Junrey Dayumat; Romy John Dionio; Joemar Ocquiana; Diomedes Manalo; Ricky Sardena; Rolando Isidro; Romel Donesa; Salvador Sumagaysay; Joseph Magno; Raymond Morales; Ambrocio Gontinas; Jose Ijalo; Jesus Asok; Usman Anterola; Roland Tan	Dragon boat	0	0	3	3

== Medal summary ==
=== By sports ===
Sport	Gold	Silver	Bronze	Total
Surfing	0	1	3	4
3x3 basketball	0	1	0	1
Dragon boat	0	0	3	3
Beach sepaktakraw	0	0	1	1
Pencak silat	0	0	1	1
Totals (5 entries)	0	2	8	10
