= Tanjung Benoa =

Coordinates: 8.7583°S 115.2194°E

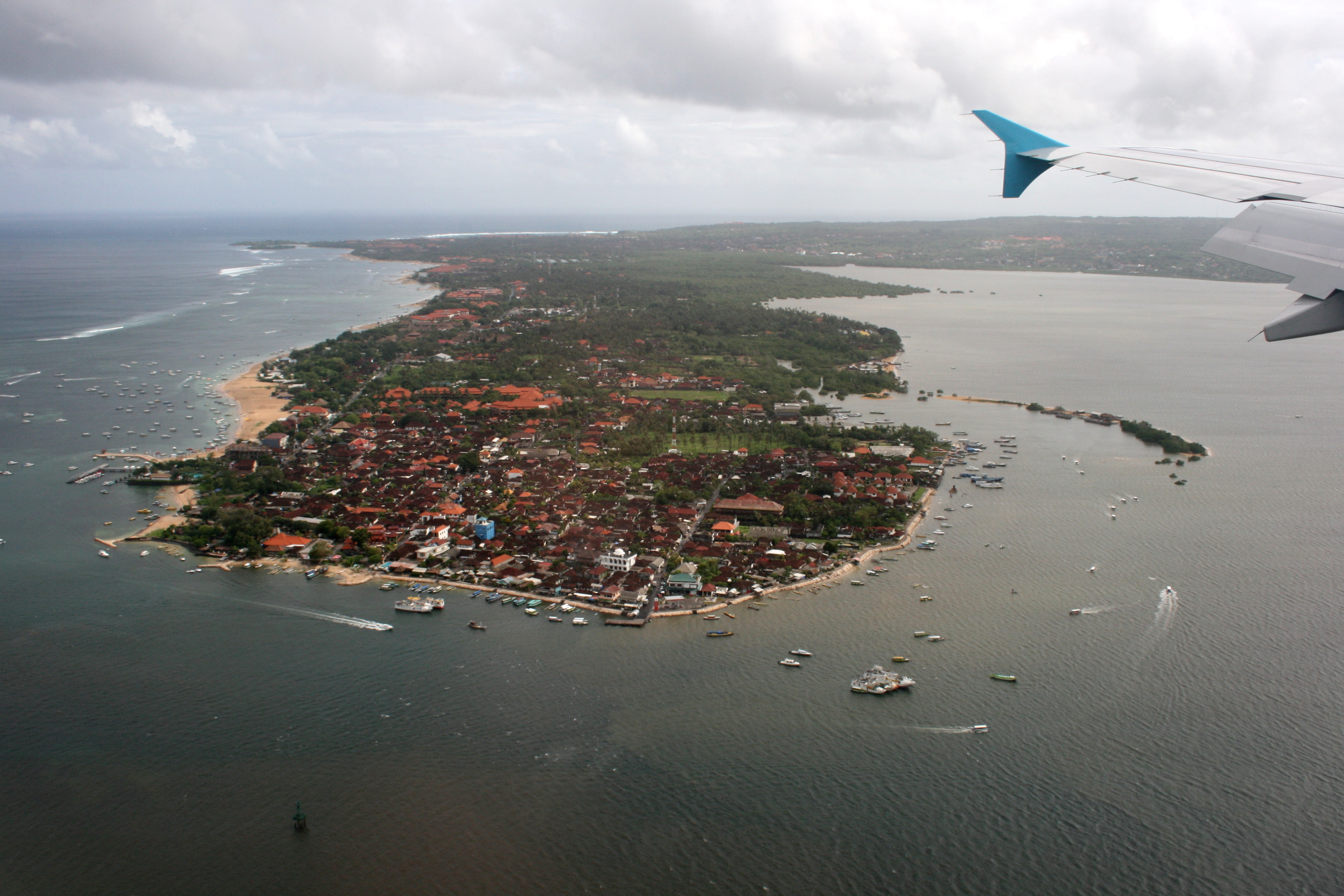
Tanjung Benoa.

Tanjung Benoa (Balinese script: ᬢᬜ᭄ᬚᬸᬂᬩᭂᬦᭀᬯ) is a peninsula that is a subdistrict (kelurahan) of Kuta South District of Badung Regency on Bali. It is famous for its beaches. Tanjung Benoa is also a location of various water sports like banana boat, scuba diving, parasailing, rolling donuts, seawalker, flying fish, snorkeling.

It is home to Benoa Cruise International Terminal which sees about 50 cruise ships every year.
