= India at the 2008 Asian Beach Games =

- IOC code: IND
- NOC: Indian Olympic Association

in Bali
- Medals Ranked 7th: Gold 3 Silver 0 Bronze 2 Total 5

Asian Beach Games appearances
- 2008; 2010; 2012; 2014; 2016; 2026

India competed at the 2008 Asian Beach Games held in Bali, Indonesia from October 18, 2008 to October 26, 2008. India finished with 3 gold medals and 2 bronze medals.

India won gold in the men's kabaddi event in 2008. The Indian women also won the gold in the kabaddi event. The Indian boys basketball team won the gold defeating Philippines in the inaugural Asian Beach Games held in Bali.
