= Pakistan at the 2010 Asian Beach Games =

- IOC code: PAK
- NOC: Pakistan Olympic Association

in Muscat
- Competitors: 26 in 4 sports
- Officials: 5
- Medals Ranked 15th: Gold 0 Silver 4 Bronze 2 Total 6

Asian Beach Games appearances
- 2008; 2010; 2012; 2014; 2016; 2026

Pakistan competed at the 2010 Asian Beach Games held in Muscat, Oman from December 8, 2010 to December 16, 2010.

== Medalists ==
Medal	Name	Sport	Event
Silver	Pakistan national Kabaddi team	Beach Kabaddi	Men
Silver	Pakistan national Handball team	Beach Handball	Men
Silver	Pakistan	Tent Pegging	Team Lance
Silver	Shahbaz Qamar	Tent Pegging	Individual Lance
Bronze	Amer Munawar	Tent Pegging	Individual Lance
Bronze	Najeeb ullah khan	Sailing	Open Laser Radial

== Medal tally by sport ==
Nation	Gold	Silver	Bronze	Total
Tent pegging	0	2	1	3
Beach handball	0	1	0	1
Beach kabaddi	0	1	0	1
Sailing	0	0	1	1
Totals (4 entries)	0	4	2	6

== Beach Handball ==
=== Group B ===
Team	Pld	W	L	GF	GA	GD	Pts
Thailand	4	3	1	123	97	+26	6
Pakistan	4	3	1	163	117	+46	6
Jordan	4	3	1	147	116	+31	6
Indonesia	1	1	3	113	143	−30	2
Afghanistan	4	0	4	79	152	−73	0

Date		Score		Set 1	Set 2	Set 3
9 Dec	Pakistan	2–0	Indonesia	24–18	24–8	
10 Dec	Pakistan	2–0	Jordan	19–16	20–18	
12 Dec	Pakistan	2–0	Afghanistan	24–11	23–13	
14 Dec	Pakistan	0–2	Thailand	12–15	17–18	

=== Knockout map ===
Semi-finals
15 December
Oman	1
Pakistan	2
15 December
Thailand	0
Kuwait	2

Final
16 December
Pakistan	0
Kuwait	2
Third place
16 December
Oman	2
Thailand	2

=== Semifinals ===
Date		Score		Set 1	Set 2	Set 3
15 Dec	Oman	1-2	Pakistan	20–18	14–15	6–8

=== Gold place match ===
Date		Score		Set 1	Set 2	Set 3
16 Dec	Pakistan	0–2	Kuwait	12–14	14–20	

== Beach Kabaddi ==
=== Group B ===
Team	Pld	W	D	L	PF	PA	PD	Pts
Pakistan	4	4	0	0	232	76	+156	8
Iran	3	2	0	1	150	102	+48	4
Sri Lanka	4	2	0	2	135	193	−58	3
Indonesia	3	1	0	2	111	130	+19	1
Afghanistan	4	0	0	4	102	229	−127	0

Date		Score	
12 Dec	Pakistan	65–9	Afghanistan
13 Dec	Pakistan	50–30	Iran
14 Dec	Pakistan	62–20	Sri Lanka
14 Dec	Pakistan	55–17	Indonesia

==== Knockout stage ====
Semi-finals
15 December
India	37
Iran	36
15 December
Pakistan	41
Oman	30

Final
16 December
India	32
Pakistan	27

== Bodybuilding ==
=== 60 kg ===
December 10

==== Pre-Judging ====
Athlete
Daljit Singh (IND)
Kamil Al-Muqaimi (OMA)
Pham Van Mach (VIE)
Asrelawandi (INA)
Jiraphan Pongkam (THA)
Muhammad Bilal (PAK)
Doljinsurengiin Enkh-Erdene (MGL)

=== 70 kg ===
December 10

==== Pre-Judging ====
Athlete
Iman Setiawan (INA)
Khalid Ali (PAK)
Nguyen Hai Au (VIE)
Sazali Abdul Samad (MAS)
Somsri Turinthaisong (THA)
Firdavs Dustov (TJK)
Suen Kwai Kei (HKG)
Husham Hameed (MDV)
Nihad Rasheed (MDV)

==== Final ====
Rank	Athlete	Score
Gold medal	Sazali Abdul Samad (MAS)	10
Silver medal	Nguyen Hai Au (VIE)	25
Bronze medal	Somsri Turinthaisong (THA)	33
4	Iman Setiawan (INA)	34
5	Khalid Ali (PAK)	51
