= Sailing at the 2010 Asian Beach Games =

- Venue: Al-Musannah Sports City
- Dates: 9–13 December 2010

Sailing at the 2010 Asian Beach Games was held from 9 December to 13 December 2010 in Muscat, Oman.

== Medalists ==
=== Men ===
Event	Gold	Silver	Bronze
RS:X	Fang Zhennan; China	Shi Chuankun; China	Ek Boonsawad; Thailand
Techno 293	Wei Bipeng; China	Navin Singsart; Thailand	Chen Mubin; China

=== Women ===
Event	Gold	Silver	Bronze
RS:X	Chen Peina; China	Napalai Tansai; Thailand	Sarocha Prumprai; Thailand
Techno 293	Siripon Kaewduang-ngam; Thailand	Megumi Iseda; Japan	Mai Mitsuishi; Japan

=== Open ===
Event	Gold	Silver	Bronze
Laser Radial	Natthawut Paenyaem; Thailand	Amirul Shafiq; Malaysia	Najeeb Ullah Khan; Pakistan
Hobie 16	Thailand; Damrongsak Vongtim; Kitsada Vongtim	Hong Kong; Tong Yui Shing; Tong Kit Fong	Thailand; Teerapong Watiboonruang; Nut Butmarasri

== Medal table ==
Rank	Nation	Gold	Silver	Bronze	Total
1	Thailand (THA)	3	2	3	8
2	China (CHN)	3	1	1	5
3	Japan (JPN)	0	1	1	2
4	Hong Kong (HKG)	0	1	0	1
4	Malaysia (MAS)	0	1	0	1
6	Pakistan (PAK)	0	0	1	1
Totals (6 entries)		6	6	6	18

== Results ==
=== Men ===
==== RS:X ====
9–13 December

Rank	Athlete	Race										Total
Rank	Athlete	1	2	3	4	5	6	7	8	9	10	Total
1st place, gold medalist(s)	Fang Zhennan (CHN)	1	1	1	1	1	1	1	2	1	~~(4)~~	10
2nd place, silver medalist(s)	Shi Chuankun (CHN)	2	2	2	~~(3)~~	2	3	2	1	3	1	18
3rd place, bronze medalist(s)	Ek Boonsawad (THA)	3	3	~~(4)~~	4	3	2	3	4	2	2	26
4	Oka Sulaksana (INA)	4	5	3	2	5	4	5	3	5	~~(6)~~	36
5	Natthaphong Phonoppharat (THA)	~~(5)~~	4	5	5	4	5	4	5	4	3	39
6	Reneric Moreno (PHI)	~~(10)~~	6	6	8	6	6	8	8	6	5	59
7	Qasim Abbas (PAK)	~~(8)~~	7	7	7	7	7	7	6	8	7	63
8	Hadri Zainal Abidin (MAS)	7	~~(10)~~	8	9	8	8	6	7	7	8	68
9	Muhammad Tanveer (PAK)	9	8	9	~~(10)~~	9	9	10	9	9	9	81
10	Hu Jin-tai (TPE)	6	9	10	6	~~(11)~~	10	9	11	11	11	83

==== Techno 293 ====
9–13 December

Rank	Athlete	Race										Total
Rank	Athlete	1	2	3	4	5	6	7	8	9	10	Total
1st place, gold medalist(s)	Wei Bipeng (CHN)	1	2	2	1	2	3	1	1	2	~~(4)~~	15
2nd place, silver medalist(s)	Navin Singsart (THA)	~~(6)~~	1	3	2	4	1	2	2	3	1	19
3rd place, bronze medalist(s)	Chen Mubin (CHN)	3	3	1	~~(5)~~	1	2	4	5	1	3	23
4	Satoshi Sagae (JPN)	7	5	4	7	~~(9)~~	6	5	3	5	5	47
5	Seiji Masubuchi (JPN)	5	4	~~(7)~~	6	6	7	3	4	7	6	48
6	Nakaret Vantana (THA)	~~(8)~~	8	8	4	3	4	8	8	4	2	49
7	Lee Chun Ting (HKG)	2	6	5	3	7	8	6	7	6	~~(11)~~	50
8	Astika Oye Wahyudi (INA)	4	7	6	~~(8)~~	5	5	7	6	8	7	55
9	Harold Madrigal (PHI)	9	~~(10)~~	10	10	8	9	9	9	9	9	82
10	Shaufi Salehhodin (MAS)	~~(10)~~	9	9	9	10	10	10	10	10	8	85

=== Women ===
==== RS:X ====
9–13 December

Rank	Athlete	Race										Total
Rank	Athlete	1	2	3	4	5	6	7	8	9	10	Total
1st place, gold medalist(s)	Chen Peina (CHN)	~~(1)~~	1	1	1	1	1	1	1	1	1	9
2nd place, silver medalist(s)	Napalai Tansai (THA)	~~(2)~~	2	2	2	2	2	2	2	2	2	18
3rd place, bronze medalist(s)	Sarocha Prumprai (THA)	3	3	3	3	3	3	3	~~(4)~~	3	3	27
4	Geh Cheow Lin (MAS)	~~(4)~~	4	4	4	4	4	4	3	4	4	35

==== Techno 293 ====
9–13 December

Rank	Athlete	Race										Total
Rank	Athlete	1	2	3	4	5	6	7	8	9	10	Total
1st place, gold medalist(s)	Siripon Kaewduang-ngam (THA)	~~(9)~~	1	2	1	1	2	1	1	2	3	14
2nd place, silver medalist(s)	Megumi Iseda (JPN)	2	~~(5)~~	4	2	2	1	2	2	1	1	17
3rd place, bronze medalist(s)	Mai Mitsuishi (JPN)	3	2	1	~~(5)~~	4	4	3	3	5	4	29
4	Chen Lina (CHN)	1	~~(7)~~	7	4	3	7	4	4	3	6	39
5	Phannipha Mangmeephol (THA)	4	3	6	3	6	3	~~(8)~~	8	6	2	41
6	Man Ka Kei (HKG)	7	4	3	7	5	6	5	5	4	~~(8)~~	46
7	Hoiriyah (INA)	6	6	5	6	~~(7)~~	5	7	6	7	5	53
8	Koe Sin Yee (MAS)	5	~~(8)~~	8	8	8	8	6	7	8	7	65

=== Open ===
==== Laser Radial ====
9–13 December

Rank	Athlete	Race										Total
Rank	Athlete	1	2	3	4	5	6	7	8	9	10	Total
1st place, gold medalist(s)	Natthawut Paenyaem (THA)	~~(25)~~	10	2	3	6	1	2	1	4	1	30
2nd place, silver medalist(s)	Amirul Shafiq (MAS)	5	6	1	1	4	5	5	4	~~(8)~~	4	35
3rd place, bronze medalist(s)	Najeeb Ullah Khan (PAK)	~~(25)~~	4	3	7	1	3	4	6	9	11	48
4	Musab Al-Hadi (OMA)	2	15	6	8	3	14	1	5	1	~~(21)~~	55
5	Harisfabillah Muhamat (MAS)	7	1	5	~~(16)~~	8	8	3	11	5	10	58
6	Ahmad Abdullateef (IOC)	~~(25)~~	9	8	13	7	6	6	2	7	6	64
7	Keerati Bualong (THA)	~~(25)~~	2	13	2	2	2	7	25	10	3	66
8	Waleed Al-Sharshani (QAT)	~~(25)~~	7	9	15	5	4	19	3	2	2	66
9	Hassan Al-Tamimi (QAT)	~~(25)~~	12	7	5	10	11	10	8	16	8	87
10	Rubin Cruz (PHI)	1	11	~~(25)~~	17	15	16	11	12	6	5	94
11	Abdulrahim Abdulla Sadeq (BRN)	~~(25)~~	8	11	6	13	9	25	7	12	7	98
12	Ruslan Jangazov (KAZ)	3	14	4	14	9	~~(17)~~	13	10	15	17	99
13	Jasvir Singh (IND)	8	3	~~(25)~~	11	12	7	25	14	13	13	106
14	Abdulla Janahi (BRN)	4	13	17	4	~~(18)~~	12	12	15	17	16	110
15	Gaurav Randhawa (IND)	11	5	18	10	11	10	~~(25)~~	17	18	12	112
16	Vladimir Chshankin (KAZ)	~~(25)~~	16	12	12	16	13	8	13	11	15	116
17	Roshil Nishantha (SRI)	6	~~(22)~~	10	21	19	18	14	19	3	9	119
18	Liu Yu-chun (TPE)	9	~~(19)~~	16	18	14	19	9	9	14	14	122
19	Muhammad Yousaf (PAK)	~~(25)~~	17	15	9	17	15	18	20	21	18	150
20	Majid Al-Mageni (OMA)	10	20	14	20	21	20	16	16	~~(23)~~	19	156
21	Abdulaziz Abdullah (IOC)	~~(25)~~	18	19	22	20	21	17	22	20	20	179
22	Krishan Janaka (SRI)	13	24	22	19	22	22	15	~~(25)~~	22	22	181
23	Abdullah Al-Subaie (KSA)	12	21	20	13	~~(24)~~	24	20	18	24	23	185
24	Ibrahim Al-Quoz (KSA)	~~(25)~~	23	21	24	23	23	21	21	19	24	199

==== Hobie 16 ====
9–13 December

Rank	Team	Race										Total
Rank	Team	1	2	3	4	5	6	7	8	9	10	Total
1st place, gold medalist(s)	Thailand (THA); Damrongsak Vongtim; Kitsada Vongtim	1	1	1	2	2	1	3	1	1	~~(5)~~	13
2nd place, silver medalist(s)	Hong Kong (HKG); Tong Yui Shing; Tong Kit Fong	2	~~(6)~~	2	1	4	3	2	5	2	6	27
3rd place, bronze medalist(s)	Thailand (THA); Teerapong Watiboonruang; Nut Butmarasri	~~(6)~~	5	3	5	5	5	1	4	3	1	32
4	Philippines (PHI); Ridgely Balladares; Richly Magsanay	4	3	4	4	~~(10)~~	7	6	2	9	2	41
5	Oman (OMA); Akram Al-Wahaibi; Hashim Al-Rashidi	3	2	5	8	8	4	4	3	5	~~(12)~~	42
6	Philippines (PHI); Joel Mejarito; Rommel Chavez	9	~~(10)~~	7	3	1	2	5	8	6	4	45
7	Kazakhstan (KAZ); Galymzhan Darigul; Anuar Kaldykozhayev	7	8	6	~~(12)~~	6	6	7	6	4	12	62
8	Oman (OMA); Sulaiman Al-Wahaibi; Abdullatif Al-Wahaibi	5	7	9	6	7	8	8	7	~~(10)~~	7	64
9	Malaysia (MAS); Firdaus Mat Yusof; Jamil Ahmad Urayah	~~(12)~~	4	8	9	3	10	11	11	8	3	67
10	Qatar (QAT); Hassan Al-Baker; Ali Al-Safran	8	9	~~(10)~~	7	9	9	9	9	7	8	75
11	Athletes from Kuwait (IOC); Mohammad Al-Hamdan; Abdullah Jonhar	10	~~(12)~~	11	10	11	11	10	10	11	9	93
