= Triathlon at the 2010 Asian Beach Games =

- Venue: North Al-Hail
- Dates: 16 December 2010

Triathlon at the 2010 Asian Beach Games was held at 16 December 2010 in Muscat, Oman.

== Medalists ==
Event	Gold	Silver	Bronze
Men's individual	Yuichi Hosoda; Japan	Dmitriy Gaag; Kazakhstan	Ryosuke Yamamoto; Japan
Women's individual	Juri Ide; Japan	Zhang Yi; China	Akane Tsuchihashi; Japan

== Medal table ==
Rank	Nation	Gold	Silver	Bronze	Total
1	Japan (JPN)	2	0	2	4
2	China (CHN)	0	1	0	1
2	Kazakhstan (KAZ)	0	1	0	1
Totals (3 entries)		2	2	2	6

== Results ==
=== Men's individual ===
16 December

Rank	Athlete	Time
1st place, gold medalist(s)	Yuichi Hosoda (JPN)	1:51:21.06
2nd place, silver medalist(s)	Dmitriy Gaag (KAZ)	1:51:39.89
3rd place, bronze medalist(s)	Ryosuke Yamamoto (JPN)	1:53:16.99
4	Daniel Lee (HKG)	1:53:42.53
5	Bai Faquan (CHN)	1:54:09.71
6	Fang Zhou (CHN)	1:54:17.16
7	Andrew Wright (HKG)	1:57:01.61
8	Kim Ju-seok (KOR)	1:58:11.35
9	Lawrence Fanous (JOR)	1:59:17.22
10	Nikko Huelgas (PHI)	1:59:44.18
11	Ehsan Aminian (IRI)	1:59:51.64
12	Yang Mao-yung (TPE)	2:01:35.35
13	Mohammad Al-Sabbagh (SYR)	2:05:45.01
14	Kuo Hsiu-shen (TPE)	2:06:20.66
15	Suliman Al-Alawi (OMA)	2:07:49.73
16	Ahmed Al-Falahi (OMA)	2:08:30.59
17	Philip Jurolan (PHI)	2:10:36.93
18	Nasser Mutarrid (KSA)	2:12:59.59
19	Firas Al-Hmood (JOR)	2:14:19.20
20	Thaworn Wongkhan (THA)	2:14:19.51
21	Thanongsak Manchai (THA)	2:14:47.96
22	Omar Al-Saleh (SYR)	2:16:07.47
23	Saif Al-Samahi (UAE)	2:16:18.02
24	Ahmed Ali Jber (UAE)	2:16:21.81
25	Bader Al-Aazmi (BRN)	2:23:28.30
26	Batchuluuny Zorigt (MGL)	2:29:02.01
27	Saqer Al-Khalifa (BRN)	2:33:28.52
—	Dmitriy Smurov (KAZ)	DNF
—	Maghsoud Shobeiri (IRI)	DNF
—	Ryan Lim (SIN)	DNF

=== Women's individual ===
16 December

Rank	Athlete	Time
1st place, gold medalist(s)	Juri Ide (JPN)	2:06:57.51
2nd place, silver medalist(s)	Zhang Yi (CHN)	2:07:54.00
3rd place, bronze medalist(s)	Akane Tsuchihashi (JPN)	2:09:04.00
4	Lea Langit (PHI)	2:13:26.09
5	Liu Ting (CHN)	2:14:29.90
6	Edith Li (HKG)	2:16:44.96
7	Kim Mangrobang (PHI)	2:23:38.98
8	Chang Luo-yi (TPE)	2:25:04.51
9	Ethel Lin (SIN)	2:30:56.53
10	Haya Ghul (JOR)	2:31:10.16
11	Mattika Maneekaew (THA)	2:33:59.69
12	Chen Pei-wen (TPE)	2:39:46.53
—	Jang Yun-jung (KOR)	DNF
