= Beach volleyball at the 2010 Asian Beach Games =

- Venue: Al-Musannah Sports City
- Dates: 9–16 December 2010

Beach volleyball at the 2010 Asian Beach Games was held from 9 December to 16 December 2010 in Al-Musannah Sports City, Muscat, Oman.

== Medalists ==
Event	Gold	Silver	Bronze
Men	China; Wu Penggen; Xu Linyin	Kazakhstan; Dmitriy Yakovlev; Alexey Sidorenko	Oman; Haitham Al-Shereiqi; Ahmed Al-Housni
Women	China; Xue Chen; Zhang Xi	Thailand; Yupa Phokongpoly; Kamoltip Kulna	Thailand; Usa Tenpaksee; Jarunee Sannok

== Medal table ==
Rank	Nation	Gold	Silver	Bronze	Total
1	China (CHN)	2	0	0	2
2	Thailand (THA)	0	1	1	2
3	Kazakhstan (KAZ)	0	1	0	1
4	Oman (OMA)	0	0	1	1
Totals (4 entries)		2	2	2	6

== Results ==
=== Men ===
==== Preliminary ====
===== Pool A =====
Pos	Team	Pld	W	L	Pts	SPW	SPL	SPR	SW	SL	SR
1	Wu–Xu (CHN)	3	3	0	6	126	57	2.211	6	0	MAX
2	Nguyễn–Phạm (VIE)	3	2	1	5	113	111	1.018	4	2	2.000
3	Al-Sheeb–Malik (QAT)	3	1	2	4	94	120	0.783	2	4	0.500
4	Som–Taing (CAM)	3	0	3	3	81	126	0.643	0	6	0.000

Source: AVC

Date		Score		Set 1	Set 2	Set 3
09 Dec	Wu–Xu (CHN)	2–0	Al-Sheeb–Malik (QAT)	21–9	21–9	
09 Dec	Som–Taing (CAM)	0–2	Nguyễn–Phạm (VIE)	18–21	17–21	
11 Dec	Som–Taing (CAM)	0–2	Al-Sheeb–Malik (QAT)	15–21	17–21	
11 Dec	Nguyễn–Phạm (VIE)	0–2	Wu–Xu (CHN)	13–21	12–21	
12 Dec	Wu–Xu (CHN)	2–0	Som–Taing (CAM)	21–8	21–6	
12 Dec	Al-Sheeb–Malik (QAT)	0–2	Nguyễn–Phạm (VIE)	11–21	23–25	

===== Pool B =====
Pos	Team	Pld	W	L	Pts	SPW	SPL	SPR	SW	SL	SR
1	Santosa–Darkuncoro (INA)	3	3	0	6	85	55	1.545	6	0	MAX
2	Fares–Abi Chedid (LIB)	3	2	1	5	111	95	1.168	4	2	2.000
3	Abdul Wahid–Abdul Hameed (MDV)	3	1	2	4	109	126	0.865	2	5	0.400
4	Al-Ajmi–Al-Sabaghah (IOC)	3	0	3	3	66	95	0.695	1	6	0.167

Source: AVC

Date		Score		Set 1	Set 2	Set 3
09 Dec	Santosa–Darkuncoro (INA)	2–0	Fares–Abi Chedid (LIB)	21–11	21–16	
09 Dec	Al-Ajmi–Al-Sabaghah (IOC)	1–2	Abdul Wahid–Abdul Hameed (MDV)	21–16	14–21	7–15
11 Dec	Al-Ajmi–Al-Sabaghah (IOC)	0–2	Fares–Abi Chedid (LIB)	11–21	13–21	
11 Dec	Abdul Wahid–Abdul Hameed (MDV)	0–2	Santosa–Darkuncoro (INA)	13–21	15–21	
12 Dec	Fares–Abi Chedid (LIB)	2–0	Abdul Wahid–Abdul Hameed (MDV)	21–19	21–10	
12 Dec	Santosa–Darkuncoro (INA)	2–0	Al-Ajmi–Al-Sabaghah (IOC)	1–0^{Ret}		

===== Pool C =====
Pos	Team	Pld	W	L	Pts	SPW	SPL	SPR	SW	SL	SR
1	Yakovlev–Sidorenko (KAZ)	3	3	0	6	126	79	1.595	6	0	MAX
2	Mahfoudh–Mohammed (YEM)	3	2	1	5	114	95	1.200	4	2	2.000
3	Southipanya–Phongsavath (LAO)	3	1	2	4	101	118	0.856	2	4	0.500
4	Akmuradow–Giligow (TKM)	3	0	3	3	77	126	0.611	0	6	0.000

Source: AVC

Date		Score		Set 1	Set 2	Set 3
09 Dec	Mahfoudh–Mohammed (YEM)	2–0	Akmuradow–Giligow (TKM)	21–12	21–9	
09 Dec	Yakovlev–Sidorenko (KAZ)	2–0	Southipanya–Phongsavath (LAO)	21–12	21–15	
11 Dec	Mahfoudh–Mohammed (YEM)	2–0	Southipanya–Phongsavath (LAO)	21–15	21–17	
11 Dec	Akmuradow–Giligow (TKM)	0–2	Yakovlev–Sidorenko (KAZ)	8–21	14–21	
12 Dec	Southipanya–Phongsavath (LAO)	2–0	Akmuradow–Giligow (TKM)	21–19	21–15	
12 Dec	Yakovlev–Sidorenko (KAZ)	2–0	Mahfoudh–Mohammed (YEM)	21–14	21–16	

===== Pool D =====
Pos	Team	Pld	W	L	Pts	SPW	SPL	SPR	SW	SL	SR
1	Toyam–Pollueang (THA)	3	3	0	6	149	117	1.274	6	1	6.000
2	Imai–Hidaka (JPN)	3	2	1	5	147	132	1.114	5	2	2.500
3	Nget–Mon (CAM)	3	1	2	4	105	106	0.991	2	4	0.500
4	Batyrow–Hallyýew (TKM)	3	0	3	3	80	126	0.635	0	6	0.000

Source: AVC

Date		Score		Set 1	Set 2	Set 3
10 Dec	Toyam–Pollueang (THA)	2–0	Batyrow–Hallyýew (TKM)	21–12	21–16	
10 Dec	Imai–Hidaka (JPN)	2–0	Nget–Mon (CAM)	21–19	21–18	
12 Dec	Imai–Hidaka (JPN)	2–0	Batyrow–Hallyýew (TKM)	21–14	21–16	
12 Dec	Nget–Mon (CAM)	0–2	Toyam–Pollueang (THA)	13–21	13–21	
13 Dec	Batyrow–Hallyýew (TKM)	0–2	Nget–Mon (CAM)	10–21	12–21	
13 Dec	Toyam–Pollueang (THA)	2–1	Imai–Hidaka (JPN)	22–20	21–23	22–20

===== Pool E =====
Pos	Team	Pld	W	L	Pts	SPW	SPL	SPR	SW	SL	SR
1	Al-Rajhi–Al-Subhi (OMA)	3	3	0	6	126	67	1.881	6	0	MAX
2	Sangkhachot–Nimnuan (THA)	3	2	1	5	110	89	1.236	4	2	2.000
3	Hammad–Sultan (BRN)	3	1	2	4	90	103	0.874	2	4	0.500
4	Xavier–Santos (TLS)	3	0	3	3	59	126	0.468	0	6	0.000

Source: AVC

Date		Score		Set 1	Set 2	Set 3
09 Dec	Al-Rajhi–Al-Subhi (OMA)	2–0	Hammad–Sultan (BRN)	21–12	21–8	
09 Dec	Sangkhachot–Nimnuan (THA)	2–0	Xavier–Santos (TLS)	21–8	21–11	
11 Dec	Al-Rajhi–Al-Subhi (OMA)	2–0	Xavier–Santos (TLS)	21–8	21–13	
11 Dec	Hammad–Sultan (BRN)	0–2	Sangkhachot–Nimnuan (THA)	17–21	11–21	
12 Dec	Sangkhachot–Nimnuan (THA)	0–2	Al-Rajhi–Al-Subhi (OMA)	18–21	8–21	
12 Dec	Xavier–Santos (TLS)	0–2	Hammad–Sultan (BRN)	8–21	11–21	

===== Pool F =====
Pos	Team	Pld	W	L	Pts	SPW	SPL	SPR	SW	SL	SR
1	Gao–Li (CHN)	3	3	0	6	126	77	1.636	6	0	MAX
2	Matar–Ebrahim (BRN)	3	2	1	5	117	98	1.194	4	2	2.000
3	Ababacar–Abdulhabib (QAT)	3	1	2	4	95	110	0.864	2	4	0.500
4	Lee–Hsiao (TPE)	3	0	3	3	73	126	0.579	0	6	0.000

Source: AVC

Date		Score		Set 1	Set 2	Set 3
10 Dec	Gao–Li (CHN)	2–0	Ababacar–Abdulhabib (QAT)	21–9	21–14	
10 Dec	Lee–Hsiao (TPE)	0–2	Matar–Ebrahim (BRN)	13–21	13–21	
12 Dec	Lee–Hsiao (TPE)	0–2	Ababacar–Abdulhabib (QAT)	14–21	12–21	
12 Dec	Matar–Ebrahim (BRN)	0–2	Gao–Li (CHN)	16–21	17–21	
13 Dec	Gao–Li (CHN)	2–0	Lee–Hsiao (TPE)	21–5	21–16	
13 Dec	Ababacar–Abdulhabib (QAT)	0–2	Matar–Ebrahim (BRN)	18–21	12–21	

===== Pool G =====
Pos	Team	Pld	W	L	Pts	SPW	SPL	SPR	SW	SL	SR
1	Al-Shereiqi–Al-Housni (OMA)	3	2	1	5	123	102	1.206	4	2	2.000
2	Perera–Rathnapala (SRI)	3	2	1	5	132	127	1.039	4	3	1.333
3	Al-Arqan–Tafesh (PLE)	3	2	1	5	122	132	0.924	4	3	1.333
4	Tang–Lin (TPE)	3	0	3	3	134	150	0.893	2	6	0.333

Source: AVC

Date		Score		Set 1	Set 2	Set 3
10 Dec	Perera–Rathnapala (SRI)	2–1	Tang–Lin (TPE)	23–21	17–21	17–15
10 Dec	Al-Shereiqi–Al-Housni (OMA)	0–2	Al-Arqan–Tafesh (PLE)	19–21	20–22	
12 Dec	Al-Arqan–Tafesh (PLE)	0–2	Perera–Rathnapala (SRI)	13–21	15–21	
12 Dec	Al-Shereiqi–Al-Housni (OMA)	2–0	Tang–Lin (TPE)	21–13	21–13	
13 Dec	Tang–Lin (TPE)	1–2	Al-Arqan–Tafesh (PLE)	17–21	21–15	13–15
13 Dec	Perera–Rathnapala (SRI)	0–2	Al-Shereiqi–Al-Housni (OMA)	18–21	15–21	

===== Pool H =====
Pos	Team	Pld	W	L	Pts	SPW	SPL	SPR	SW	SL	SR
1	Hasegawa–Murakami (JPN)	3	3	0	6	127	75	1.693	6	0	MAX
2	Kumara–Peiris (SRI)	3	2	1	5	118	87	1.356	4	2	2.000
3	Adam–Sajid (MDV)	3	1	2	4	108	137	0.788	2	5	0.400
4	da Rocha–Correia (TLS)	3	0	3	3	85	139	0.612	1	6	0.167

Source: AVC

Date		Score		Set 1	Set 2	Set 3
10 Dec	Kumara–Peiris (SRI)	2–0	da Rocha–Correia (TLS)	21–8	21–11	
10 Dec	Hasegawa–Murakami (JPN)	2–0	Adam–Sajid (MDV)	21–16	21–12	
12 Dec	Adam–Sajid (MDV)	0–2	Kumara–Peiris (SRI)	7–21	18–21	
12 Dec	Hasegawa–Murakami (JPN)	2–0	da Rocha–Correia (TLS)	21–3	21–10	
13 Dec	da Rocha–Correia (TLS)	1–2	Adam–Sajid (MDV)	18–21	21–18	14–16
13 Dec	Kumara–Peiris (SRI)	0–2	Hasegawa–Murakami (JPN)	20–22	14–21	

==== Knockout round ====
Round of 16; 14 December
Wu–Xu (CHN)	21	21
Mahfoudh–Mohammed (YEM)	9	12
Perera–Rathnapala (SRI)	21	21
Hasegawa–Murakami (JPN)	15	19
Al-Rajhi–Al-Subhi (OMA)	24	21	16
Fares–Abi Chedid (LIB)	26	13	14
Matar–Ebrahim (BRN)	17	21	15
Toyam–Pollueang (THA)	21	17	13
Yakovlev–Sidorenko (KAZ)	21	21
Imai–Hidaka (JPN)	13	15
Nguyễn–Phạm (VIE)	12	14
Gao–Li (CHN)	21	21
Al-Shereiqi–Al-Housni (OMA)	21	21
Kumara–Peiris (SRI)	14	17
Sangkhachot–Nimnuan (THA)	19	17
Santosa–Darkuncoro (INA)	21	21

Quarterfinals; 15 December
Wu–Xu (CHN)	21	21
Perera–Rathnapala (SRI)	10	13
Al-Rajhi–Al-Subhi (OMA)	19	16
Matar–Ebrahim (BRN)	21	21
Yakovlev–Sidorenko (KAZ)	21	28
Gao–Li (CHN)	14	26
Al-Shereiqi–Al-Housni (OMA)	14	21	16
Santosa–Darkuncoro (INA)	21	19	14

Semifinals; 15 December
Wu–Xu (CHN)	21	21
Matar–Ebrahim (BRN)	11	10
Yakovlev–Sidorenko (KAZ)	21	21
Al-Shereiqi–Al-Housni (OMA)	17	13

Gold medal match 16 December
Wu–Xu (CHN)	21	21	15
Yakovlev–Sidorenko (KAZ)	16	23	3
Bronze medal match
Matar–Ebrahim (BRN)	17	13^{R}
Al-Shereiqi–Al-Housni (OMA)	21	18

=== Women ===
==== Preliminary ====
===== Pool A =====
Pos	Team	Pld	W	L	Pts	SPW	SPL	SPR	SW	SL	SR
1	Xue–Zhang (CHN)	4	4	0	8	168	65	2.585	8	0	MAX
2	Siam–Kapasiang (INA)	4	3	1	7	150	100	1.500	6	2	3.000
3	Douangsavanh–Nanthavong (LAO)	4	2	2	6	134	142	0.944	4	5	0.800
4	Samoull–Kassem (SYR)	4	1	3	5	121	157	0.771	3	6	0.500
5	Saffa–Abdul Azeez (MDV)	4	0	4	4	59	168	0.351	0	8	0.000

Source: AVC

Date		Score		Set 1	Set 2	Set 3
09 Dec	Xue–Zhang (CHN)	2–0	Samoull–Kassem (SYR)	21–7	21–4	
09 Dec	Siam–Kapasiang (INA)	2–0	Douangsavanh–Nanthavong (LAO)	21–9	21–9	
10 Dec	Xue–Zhang (CHN)	2–0	Siam–Kapasiang (INA)	21–10	21–14	
10 Dec	Saffa–Abdul Azeez (MDV)	0–2	Douangsavanh–Nanthavong (LAO)	7–21	7–21	
11 Dec	Samoull–Kassem (SYR)	0–2	Siam–Kapasiang (INA)	13–21	11–21	
11 Dec	Saffa–Abdul Azeez (MDV)	0–2	Xue–Zhang (CHN)	9–21	1–21	
12 Dec	Douangsavanh–Nanthavong (LAO)	0–2	Xue–Zhang (CHN)	11–21	9–21	
12 Dec	Samoull–Kassem (SYR)	2–0	Saffa–Abdul Azeez (MDV)	21–9	21–10	
13 Dec	Siam–Kapasiang (INA)	2–0	Saffa–Abdul Azeez (MDV)	21–3	21–13	
13 Dec	Douangsavanh–Nanthavong (LAO)	2–1	Samoull–Kassem (SYR)	21–14	18–21	15–9

===== Pool B =====
Pos	Team	Pld	W	L	Pts	SPW	SPL	SPR	SW	SL	SR
1	Huang–Yue (CHN)	4	4	0	8	168	76	2.211	8	0	MAX
2	Wijayanti–Irawati (INA)	4	3	1	7	149	122	1.221	6	2	3.000
3	Phan–Mai (VIE)	4	2	2	6	150	113	1.327	4	4	1.000
4	Ibrahim–Masoud (SYR)	4	1	3	5	110	135	0.815	2	6	0.333
5	Nazirova–Taygunshoeva (TJK)	4	0	4	4	37	168	0.220	0	8	0.000

Source: AVC

Date		Score		Set 1	Set 2	Set 3
09 Dec	Wijayanti–Irawati (INA)	2–0	Phan–Mai (VIE)	21–16	21–18	
09 Dec	Huang–Yue (CHN)	2–0	Ibrahim–Masoud (SYR)	21–12	21–9	
10 Dec	Huang–Yue (CHN)	2–0	Wijayanti–Irawati (INA)	21–14	21–9	
10 Dec	Nazirova–Taygunshoeva (TJK)	0–2	Phan–Mai (VIE)	6–21	4–21	
11 Dec	Ibrahim–Masoud (SYR)	0–2	Wijayanti–Irawati (INA)	15–21	13–21	
11 Dec	Nazirova–Taygunshoeva (TJK)	0–2	Huang–Yue (CHN)	0–21	0–21	
12 Dec	Ibrahim–Masoud (SYR)	2–0	Nazirova–Taygunshoeva (TJK)	21–5	21–4	
12 Dec	Phan–Mai (VIE)	0–2	Huang–Yue (CHN)	18–21	14–21	
13 Dec	Wijayanti–Irawati (INA)	2–0	Nazirova–Taygunshoeva (TJK)	21–9	21–9	
13 Dec	Phan–Mai (VIE)	2–0	Ibrahim–Masoud (SYR)	21–10	21–9	

===== Pool C =====
Pos	Team	Pld	W	L	Pts	SPW	SPL	SPR	SW	SL	SR
1	Phokongpoly–Kulna (THA)	4	4	0	8	187	111	1.685	8	1	8.000
2	Kou–Chang (TPE)	4	3	1	7	179	106	1.689	6	3	2.000
3	Ozaki–Ishida (JPN)	4	2	2	6	173	125	1.384	6	4	1.500
4	Araujo–Sanches (TLS)	4	1	3	5	73	153	0.477	2	6	0.333
5	Rene–Karyaeva (TJK)	4	0	4	4	51	168	0.304	0	8	0.000

Source: AVC

Date		Score		Set 1	Set 2	Set 3
09 Dec	Kou–Chang (TPE)	2–1	Ozaki–Ishida (JPN)	19–21	21–12	15–12
09 Dec	Phokongpoly–Kulna (THA)	2–0	Araujo–Sanches (TLS)	21–6	21–7	
10 Dec	Rene–Karyaeva (TJK)	0–2	Ozaki–Ishida (JPN)	2–21	2–21	
10 Dec	Phokongpoly–Kulna (THA)	2–0	Kou–Chang (TPE)	21–15	27–25	
11 Dec	Araujo–Sanches (TLS)	0–2	Kou–Chang (TPE)	4–21	3–21	
11 Dec	Rene–Karyaeva (TJK)	0–2	Phokongpoly–Kulna (THA)	5–21	9–21	
12 Dec	Araujo–Sanches (TLS)	2–0	Rene–Karyaeva (TJK)	21–16	21–11	
12 Dec	Ozaki–Ishida (JPN)	1–2	Phokongpoly–Kulna (THA)	21–19	11–21	12–15
13 Dec	Kou–Chang (TPE)	2–0	Rene–Karyaeva (TJK)	21–2	21–4	
13 Dec	Ozaki–Ishida (JPN)	2–0	Araujo–Sanches (TLS)	21–3	21–8	

===== Pool D =====
Pos	Team	Pld	W	L	Pts	SPW	SPL	SPR	SW	SL	SR
1	Tenpaksee–Sannok (THA)	4	4	0	8	168	98	1.714	8	0	MAX
2	Mashkova–Tsimbalova (KAZ)	4	3	1	7	166	116	1.431	6	2	3.000
3	Kusano–Oyama (JPN)	4	2	2	6	139	134	1.037	4	4	1.000
4	Hsieh–Liu (TPE)	4	1	3	5	124	144	0.861	2	6	0.333
5	Lopes–Oliveira (TLS)	4	0	4	4	63	168	0.375	0	8	0.000

Source: AVC

Date		Score		Set 1	Set 2	Set 3
09 Dec	Tenpaksee–Sannok (THA)	2–0	Lopes–Oliveira (TLS)	21–8	21–4	
09 Dec	Mashkova–Tsimbalova (KAZ)	2–0	Kusano–Oyama (JPN)	24–22	21–10	
10 Dec	Hsieh–Liu (TPE)	0–2	Kusano–Oyama (JPN)	16–21	15–21	
10 Dec	Tenpaksee–Sannok (THA)	2–0	Mashkova–Tsimbalova (KAZ)	21–19	21–18	
11 Dec	Lopes–Oliveira (TLS)	0–2	Mashkova–Tsimbalova (KAZ)	6–21	11–21	
11 Dec	Hsieh–Liu (TPE)	0–2	Tenpaksee–Sannok (THA)	11–21	15–21	
12 Dec	Lopes–Oliveira (TLS)	0–2	Hsieh–Liu (TPE)	8–21	10–21	
12 Dec	Kusano–Oyama (JPN)	0–2	Tenpaksee–Sannok (THA)	9–21	14–21	
13 Dec	Mashkova–Tsimbalova (KAZ)	2–0	Hsieh–Liu (TPE)	21–10	21–15	
13 Dec	Kusano–Oyama (JPN)	2–0	Lopes–Oliveira (TLS)	21–9	21–7	

==== Knockout round ====
Round of 16; 14 December
Xue–Zhang (CHN)	W	O
Araujo–Sanches (TLS)
Kusano–Oyama (JPN)	11	12
Kou–Chang (TPE)	21	21
Wijayanti–Irawati (INA)	14	21	15
Ozaki–Ishida (JPN)	21	19	10
Samoull–Kassem (SYR)	8	4
Tenpaksee–Sannok (THA)	21	21
Phokongpoly–Kulna (THA)	21	21
Ibrahim–Masoud (SYR)	4	4
Phan–Mai (VIE)	10	18
Siam–Kapasiang (INA)	21	21
Mashkova–Tsimbalova (KAZ)	21	21
Douangsavanh–Nanthavong (LAO)	11	9
Hsieh–Liu (TPE)	11	13
Huang–Yue (CHN)	21	21

Quarterfinals; 15 December
Xue–Zhang (CHN)	21	21
Kou–Chang (TPE)	10	13
Wijayanti–Irawati (INA)	11	15
Tenpaksee–Sannok (THA)	21	21
Phokongpoly–Kulna (THA)	14	21	15
Siam–Kapasiang (INA)	21	16	12
Mashkova–Tsimbalova (KAZ)	21	19	9
Huang–Yue (CHN)	19	21	15

Semifinals; 15 December
Xue–Zhang (CHN)	21	21
Tenpaksee–Sannok (THA)	12	12
Phokongpoly–Kulna (THA)	14	21	15
Huang–Yue (CHN)	21	17	12

Gold medal match 16 December
Xue–Zhang (CHN)	21	21
Phokongpoly–Kulna (THA)	9	12
Bronze medal match
Tenpaksee–Sannok (THA)	21	21
Huang–Yue (CHN)	19	18
