= Beach sepak takraw at the 2010 Asian Beach Games =

- Venue: Al-Musannah Sports City
- Dates: 9–16 December 2010

Beach sepak takraw at the 2010 Asian Beach Games was held from 9 December to 16 December 2010 in Muscat, Oman.

== Medalists ==
| Event | Gold | Silver | Bronze |
|---|---|---|---|
| Men's regu | Thailand; Nattawut Panomai; Sarawut Inlek; Seksan Tubtong; Komkid Suapimpa; Phakpong Dejaroen; Rawat Parbchompoo | Myanmar; Aung Cho Myint; Aung Myo Swe; Si Thu Lin; Zaw Latt; Kyaw Soe Win; Zaw Zaw Aung | Oman; Mohammed Al-Maashari; Mohammed Al-Abdali; Abdullah Al-Sadi; Mazin Al-Dhabari; Abdulhafid Mohammed; Ahmed Al-Yarbi |
| Men's regu | Thailand; Nattawut Panomai; Sarawut Inlek; Seksan Tubtong; Komkid Suapimpa; Phakpong Dejaroen; Rawat Parbchompoo | Myanmar; Aung Cho Myint; Aung Myo Swe; Si Thu Lin; Zaw Latt; Kyaw Soe Win; Zaw Zaw Aung | Brunei; Ismail Ang; Mohd Shukri Jaineh; Abdul Amin Mahari; Abdul Hadi Matali; Nur Alimin Sungoh; Mohd Azri Tahir |
| Men's team regu | Thailand; Tinnakorn Puntes; Nattawut Panomai; Sakol Jandong; Sarawut Inlek; Phirathep Pantaeng; Seksan Tubtong; Aphisak Sarachon; Komkid Suapimpa; Phakpong Dejaroen; Akkasit Hanratub; Rawat Parbchompoo; Prasert Pongpung | Myanmar; Aung Cho Myint; Thein Zaw Min; Aung Myo Swe; Si Thu Lin; Zaw Latt; Kyaw Soe Win; Aung Zaw; Zaw Zaw Aung | Oman; Malik Al-Habsi; Ali Al-Hinai; Mohammed Al-Maashari; Mohammed Al-Abdali; Moosa Al-Raqqadi; Abdullah Al-Sadi; Ahmed Al-Droushi; Almundntnir Al-Hasani; Faisal Al-Harthi; Mazin Al-Dhabari; Abdulhateedh Ghulam; Ahmed Al-Yarbi |
| Men's team regu | Thailand; Tinnakorn Puntes; Nattawut Panomai; Sakol Jandong; Sarawut Inlek; Phirathep Pantaeng; Seksan Tubtong; Aphisak Sarachon; Komkid Suapimpa; Phakpong Dejaroen; Akkasit Hanratub; Rawat Parbchompoo; Prasert Pongpung | Myanmar; Aung Cho Myint; Thein Zaw Min; Aung Myo Swe; Si Thu Lin; Zaw Latt; Kyaw Soe Win; Aung Zaw; Zaw Zaw Aung | Indonesia; Rizky Abdul Rahman Pago; Haris Munandar; Sugeite Arifin; Zulkifli; Abdul Halim Radjiu; Alfin Alim; Yopi Hendra Utama; Brian Agung Pamungkas; Ali Fikri; Rohman Hidayat; Aris Ardianto; Akitirman |
| Women's regu | Thailand; Waree Nantasing; Orathai Buasri; Piyapan Tungjai; Fueangfa Praphatsarang; Apinya Thongpoo; Somruedee Pruepruk | China; Wang Xiaohua; Zhou Ronghong; Wang Jianshuang; Zhang Yanan; Cui Yonghui; Song Cheng | Vietnam; Kim Thị Trang; Nguyễn Thái Linh; Lê Thị Huyền; Nguyễn Thị Quyên; Nguyễn Thị Hòa; Đỗ Thị Xuân |
| Women's regu | Thailand; Waree Nantasing; Orathai Buasri; Piyapan Tungjai; Fueangfa Praphatsarang; Apinya Thongpoo; Somruedee Pruepruk | China; Wang Xiaohua; Zhou Ronghong; Wang Jianshuang; Zhang Yanan; Cui Yonghui; Song Cheng | Indonesia; Sutini Binti Seni; Roslin Dida; Gallih Desiari; Ayu Lestari; Desi Indah Kurniasari; Indra Yuliasti |
| Women's team regu | Thailand; Waree Nantasing; Orathai Buasri; Jariya Seesawad; Piyapan Tungjai; Nittaya Boonjuang; Mutita Chanai; Fueangfa Praphatsarang; Pinporn Klongbungkar; Apinya Thongpoo; Somruedee Pruepruk; Kanjana Yanyajan; Kattareeya Kasri | Vietnam; Lê Thị Tâm; Trần Hồng Nhung; Nguyễn Thị Mơ; Kim Thị Trang; Nguyễn Thái Linh; Hoàng Thị Đài Trang; Lê Thị Huyền; Bùi Thị Thùy Linh; Nguyễn Thị Quyên; Nguyễn Thị Hòa; Đỗ Thị Xuân; Phạm Thị Luật | China; Sun Xiaodan; Liu Yanhong; Wang Xiaohua; Zhou Ronghong; Wang Jianshuang; Gu Xihui; Liu Xiaofang; Zhang Yanan; Lao Tianxue; Cui Yonghui; Song Cheng; Zhao Tengfei |
| Women's team regu | Thailand; Waree Nantasing; Orathai Buasri; Jariya Seesawad; Piyapan Tungjai; Nittaya Boonjuang; Mutita Chanai; Fueangfa Praphatsarang; Pinporn Klongbungkar; Apinya Thongpoo; Somruedee Pruepruk; Kanjana Yanyajan; Kattareeya Kasri | Vietnam; Lê Thị Tâm; Trần Hồng Nhung; Nguyễn Thị Mơ; Kim Thị Trang; Nguyễn Thái Linh; Hoàng Thị Đài Trang; Lê Thị Huyền; Bùi Thị Thùy Linh; Nguyễn Thị Quyên; Nguyễn Thị Hòa; Đỗ Thị Xuân; Phạm Thị Luật | Indonesia; Devya Sari; Sutini Binti Seni; Nina Karmila; Dwi Asih; Irma Wati; Roslin Dida; Gallih Desiari; Ayu Lestari; Lena; Desi Indah Kurniasari; Hasmawati Umar; Indra Yuliasti |

== Medal table ==
| Rank | Nation | Gold | Silver | Bronze | Total |
|---|---|---|---|---|---|
| 1 | Thailand (THA) | 4 | 0 | 0 | 4 |
| 2 | Myanmar (MYA) | 0 | 2 | 0 | 2 |
| 3 | China (CHN) | 0 | 1 | 1 | 2 |
| 3 | Vietnam (VIE) | 0 | 1 | 1 | 2 |
| 5 | Indonesia (INA) | 0 | 0 | 3 | 3 |
| 6 | Oman (OMA) | 0 | 0 | 2 | 2 |
| 7 | Brunei (BRU) | 0 | 0 | 1 | 1 |
| Totals (7 entries) | | 4 | 4 | 8 | 16 |

== Results ==
=== Men's regu ===
==== Preliminary round ====
===== Group A =====
| Pos | Team | Pld | W | L | SF | SA | SD | Pts |
|---|---|---|---|---|---|---|---|---|
| 1 | Thailand | 3 | 3 | 0 | 6 | 0 | +6 | 6 |
| 2 | Brunei | 3 | 2 | 1 | 4 | 3 | +1 | 4 |
| 3 | Indonesia | 3 | 1 | 2 | 2 | 5 | −3 | 2 |
| 4 | South Korea | 3 | 0 | 3 | 2 | 6 | −4 | 0 |

Source: Official website

| Date | | Score | | Set 1 | Set 2 | Set 3 |
|---|---|---|---|---|---|---|
| 13 Dec | South Korea | 1–2 | Brunei | 15–21 | 21–17 | 13–15 |
| 13 Dec | South Korea | 1–2 | Indonesia | 15–21 | 22–20 | 13–15 |
| 13 Dec | Thailand | 2–0 | Brunei | 21–5 | 21–12 | |
| 14 Dec | Thailand | 2–0 | South Korea | 21–9 | 21–8 | |
| 14 Dec | Indonesia | 0–2 | Brunei | 22–24 | 15–21 | |
| 15 Dec | Thailand | 2–0 | Indonesia | 21–13 | 21–10 | |

===== Group B =====
| Pos | Team | Pld | W | L | SF | SA | SD | Pts |
|---|---|---|---|---|---|---|---|---|
| 1 | Myanmar | 4 | 4 | 0 | 8 | 0 | +8 | 8 |
| 2 | Oman | 4 | 3 | 1 | 6 | 3 | +3 | 6 |
| 3 | China | 4 | 2 | 2 | 4 | 4 | 0 | 4 |
| 4 | Singapore | 4 | 1 | 3 | 3 | 6 | −3 | 2 |
| 5 | Philippines | 4 | 0 | 4 | 0 | 8 | −8 | 0 |

Source: Official website

| Date | | Score | | Set 1 | Set 2 | Set 3 |
|---|---|---|---|---|---|---|
| 13 Dec | Myanmar | 2–0 | Philippines | Walkover | | |
| 13 Dec | Singapore | 1–2 | Oman | 21–18 | 12–21 | 6–15 |
| 13 Dec | Oman | 2–0 | Philippines | Walkover | | |
| 13 Dec | Singapore | 0–2 | China | 16–21 | 16–21 | |
| 14 Dec | Singapore | 2–0 | Philippines | Walkover | | |
| 14 Dec | Myanmar | 2–0 | China | 21–12 | 21–10 | |
| 14 Dec | Myanmar | 2–0 | Oman | 21–9 | 21–4 | |
| 14 Dec | China | 2–0 | Philippines | Walkover | | |
| 15 Dec | Myanmar | 2–0 | Singapore | 21–9 | 21–11 | |
| 15 Dec | China | 0–2 | Oman | 19–21 | 10–21 | |

==== Knockout round ====
| Semifinals; 15 December | | | Final; 16 December |
| Thailand | 21 | 21 |
| Oman | 10 | 15 | Thailand | 21 | 21 |
| Brunei | 13 | 10 | Myanmar | 14 | 11 |
| Myanmar | 21 | 21 |

=== Men's team regu ===
==== Preliminary ====
===== Group A =====
| Pos | Team | Pld | W | L | MF | MA | MD | Pts |
|---|---|---|---|---|---|---|---|---|
| 1 | Thailand | 2 | 2 | 0 | 4 | 0 | +4 | 4 |
| 2 | Indonesia | 2 | 1 | 1 | 2 | 2 | 0 | 2 |
| 3 | China | 2 | 0 | 2 | 0 | 4 | −4 | 0 |

Source: Official website

| Date | | Score | | Regu 1 | Regu 2 | Regu 3 |
|---|---|---|---|---|---|---|
| 09 Dec | Thailand | 2–0 | China | 2–0 | 2–0 | |
| 09 Dec | Indonesia | 2–0 | China | 2–0 | 2–0 | |
| 10 Dec | Thailand | 2–0 | Indonesia | 2–0 | 2–0 | |

===== Group B =====
| Pos | Team | Pld | W | L | MF | MA | MD | Pts |
|---|---|---|---|---|---|---|---|---|
| 1 | Myanmar | 2 | 2 | 0 | 4 | 0 | +4 | 4 |
| 2 | Oman | 2 | 1 | 1 | 2 | 2 | 0 | 2 |
| 3 | India | 2 | 0 | 2 | 0 | 4 | −4 | 0 |

Source: Official website

| Date | | Score | | Regu 1 | Regu 2 | Regu 3 |
|---|---|---|---|---|---|---|
| 09 Dec | Myanmar | 2–0 | Oman | 2–0 | 2–0 | |
| 09 Dec | India | 0–2 | Oman | Walkover | | |
| 10 Dec | Myanmar | 2–0 | India | Walkover | | |

==== Knockout round ====
11 December

| Semifinals | | | Final |
| Thailand | 2 | 2 |
| Oman | 0 | 0 | Thailand | 2 | 2 |
| Indonesia | 0 | 0 | Myanmar | 0 | 0 |
| Myanmar | 2 | 2 |

=== Women's regu ===
| Pos | Team | Pld | W | L | SF | SA | SD | Pts |
|---|---|---|---|---|---|---|---|---|
| 1 | Thailand | 4 | 4 | 0 | 8 | 1 | +7 | 8 |
| 2 | China | 4 | 3 | 1 | 7 | 3 | +4 | 6 |
| 3 | Vietnam | 4 | 2 | 2 | 4 | 5 | −1 | 4 |
| 4 | Indonesia | 4 | 1 | 3 | 4 | 6 | −2 | 2 |
| 5 | Philippines | 4 | 0 | 4 | 0 | 8 | −8 | 0 |

Source: Official website

| Date | | Score | | Set 1 | Set 2 | Set 3 |
|---|---|---|---|---|---|---|
| 13 Dec | China | 1–2 | Thailand | 17–21 | 21–15 | 6–15 |
| 13 Dec | Philippines | 0–2 | Indonesia | 12–21 | 16–21 | |
| 13 Dec | Philippines | 0–2 | Thailand | 15–21 | 7–21 | |
| 13 Dec | Indonesia | 1–2 | Vietnam | 21–15 | 8–21 | 16–17 |
| 14 Dec | Vietnam | 0–2 | Thailand | 8–21 | 15–21 | |
| 14 Dec | China | 2–0 | Philippines | 21–18 | 21–6 | |
| 14 Dec | China | 2–0 | Vietnam | 21–15 | 21–19 | |
| 14 Dec | Indonesia | 0–2 | Thailand | 11–21 | 16–21 | |
| 15 Dec | Philippines | 0–2 | Vietnam | 15–21 | 14–21 | |
| 15 Dec | China | 2–1 | Indonesia | 21–12 | 20–22 | 15–9 |

=== Women's team regu ===
| Pos | Team | Pld | W | L | MF | MA | MD | Pts |
|---|---|---|---|---|---|---|---|---|
| 1 | Thailand | 4 | 4 | 0 | 8 | 0 | +8 | 8 |
| 2 | Vietnam | 4 | 3 | 1 | 6 | 3 | +3 | 6 |
| 3 | China | 4 | 2 | 2 | 5 | 5 | 0 | 4 |
| 4 | Indonesia | 4 | 1 | 3 | 3 | 6 | −3 | 2 |
| 5 | India | 4 | 0 | 4 | 0 | 8 | −8 | 0 |

Source: Official website

| Date | | Score | | Regu 1 | Regu 2 | Regu 3 |
|---|---|---|---|---|---|---|
| 09 Dec | China | 1–2 | Vietnam | 0–2 | 2–0 | 8–15 |
| 09 Dec | India | 0–2 | Indonesia | Walkover | | |
| 09 Dec | China | 0–2 | Thailand | 0–2 | 0–2 | |
| 10 Dec | Indonesia | 0–2 | Vietnam | 0–2 | 0–2 | |
| 10 Dec | China | 2–0 | India | Walkover | | |
| 10 Dec | India | 0–2 | Vietnam | Walkover | | |
| 10 Dec | Thailand | 2–0 | Indonesia | 2–0 | 2–0 | |
| 11 Dec | India | 0–2 | Thailand | Walkover | | |
| 11 Dec | China | 2–1 | Indonesia | 2–0 | 0–2 | 15–12 |
| 11 Dec | Thailand | 2–0 | Vietnam | 2–0 | 2–0 | |
