= Water skiing at the 2010 Asian Beach Games =

- Venue: Barr Al-Jissah Resort
- Dates: 14–15 December 2010

Water skiing at the 2010 Asian Beach Games was held from 14 December to 15 December 2010 in Muscat, Oman.

== Medalists ==
=== Trick skiing ===
Event	Gold	Silver	Bronze
Men's individual	Kim Dong-eon; South Korea	Kim Dong-ha; South Korea	Maliki Zulkarnain; Indonesia
Women's individual	Song Yufei; China	Li Jinmei; China	Jiang Hui; China
Team overall	China; Shi Longfei; Lun Sibo; Gai Yuhao; Song Yufei; Li Jinmei; Jiang Hui	South Korea; Kim Dong-eon; Kim Dong-ha; Jeong Ji-min; Jang Da-hyeong; Seo Na-na; Gu Jeoung-eun	Indonesia; Maliki Zulkarnain; Nur Akbar Imansyah; Andri Muhamad Febiandi; Inawati Setiawan; Dini Imaniar

=== Wakeboarding ===
Event	Gold	Silver	Bronze
Men's individual	Bunyalo Jumruang; Thailand	Padiwat Jaemjan; Thailand	Salvador Chiha; Lebanon
Women's individual	Chen Lili; China	Seo Jeong-lan; South Korea	Teng Pei-shan; Chinese Taipei
Team overall	South Korea; Ji Hoon; Kim Yang-su; Jung In-sang; Seo Jeong-lan; Jeon So-hyun; Kim Soo-yeon	Thailand; Bunyalo Jumruang; Padiwat Jaemjan; Tatsanai Kuakoonrat	China; Zhang Wei; Shu Zhenjun; Zhang Zhijie; Chen Lili; Wan Weidan; Han Qiu

== Medal table ==
Rank	Nation	Gold	Silver	Bronze	Total
1	China (CHN)	3	1	2	6
2	South Korea (KOR)	2	3	0	5
3	Thailand (THA)	1	2	0	3
4	Indonesia (INA)	0	0	2	2
5	Chinese Taipei (TPE)	0	0	1	1
5	Lebanon (LIB)	0	0	1	1
Totals (6 entries)		6	6	6	18

== Results ==
=== Trick skiing ===
==== Men's individual ====
14–15 December

Rank	Athlete	Prel.	Final
1st place, gold medalist(s)	Kim Dong-eon (KOR)	1610	3120
2nd place, silver medalist(s)	Kim Dong-ha (KOR)	2960	2620
3rd place, bronze medalist(s)	Maliki Zulkarnain (INA)	1850	2380
4	Shi Longfei (CHN)	1580	2350
5	Nur Akbar Imansyah (INA)	1030	2310
6	Lun Sibo (CHN)	1870	2150
7	Andri Muhamad Febiandi (INA)	970	1610
8	Jeong Ji-min (KOR)	470	1350
9	Hadi Irfan Rahaizah (MAS)	660	660
10	Gai Yuhao (CHN)	590	550
11	Waleed Al-Ali (UAE)	950	440
12	Mohammed Al-Ali (UAE)	760	200
13	Adel Al-Harbi (KSA)	0	0

==== Women's individual ====
14–15 December

Rank	Athlete	Prel.	Final
1st place, gold medalist(s)	Song Yufei (CHN)	2050	2730
2nd place, silver medalist(s)	Li Jinmei (CHN)	2100	1890
3rd place, bronze medalist(s)	Jiang Hui (CHN)	1820	1750
4	Phillipa Yoong (MAS)	1250	1230
5	Aaliyah Yoong (MAS)	1420	920
6	Hanis Azemi (MAS)	750	890
7	Dini Imaniar (INA)	910	500
8	Inawati Setiawan (INA)	1230	220
9	Jang Da-hyeong (KOR)	460	200
10	Gu Jeoung-eun (KOR)	140	170
11	Seo Na-na (KOR)	200	140

==== Team overall ====
14–15 December

Rank	Team	Score
1st place, gold medalist(s)	China (CHN)	2522.44
2nd place, silver medalist(s)	South Korea (KOR)	2117.22
3rd place, bronze medalist(s)	Indonesia (INA)	1953.75
4	Malaysia (MAS)	1189.57
5	United Arab Emirates (UAE)	548.08
6	Saudi Arabia (KSA)	0.00

=== Wakeboarding ===
==== Men's individual ====
===== Quarterfinals =====
14 December

Rank	Athlete	Score
Heat 1
1	Jung In-sang (KOR)	56.80
2	Ji Hoon (KOR)	55.08
3	Saleh Al-Duwaisan (IOC)	34.70
4	Carlos Pangemanan (INA)	25.35
5	Alek Hanif (INA)	23.13
6	Zhang Zhijie (CHN)	22.89
Heat 2
1	Bunyalo Jumruang (THA)	68.35
2	Julien Breistroff (HKG)	63.13
3	Cheung Ho Lung (HKG)	59.24
4	Carlo dela Torre (PHI)	47.13
5	Shu Zhenjun (CHN)	32.11
6	Rawad Bou Maachar (LIB)	29.14
Heat 3
1	Zhang Wei (CHN)	46.14
2	Salvador Chiha (LIB)	40.90
3	Robert Caratti (PHI)	37.02
4	Cyril Zreik (LIB)	27.80
5	Shamal Norman Rahman (MAS)	24.01
6	Febrianto Kadir (INA)	20.68
Heat 4
1	Padiwat Jaemjan (THA)	68.90
2	Kim Yang-su (KOR)	46.03
3	Tatsanai Kuakoonrat (THA)	43.36
4	Bader Al-Jihayem (IOC)	41.35
5	Lin Hao-ting (TPE)	38.89
6	Falah Al-Falah (IOC)	10.00

===== Last chance qualifiers =====
14 December

Rank	Athlete	Score
Heat 1
1	Carlo dela Torre (PHI)	37.13
2	Shamal Norman Rahman (MAS)	24.78
3	Febrianto Kadir (INA)	19.78
4	Saleh Al-Duwaisan (IOC)	15.68
Heat 2
1	Robert Caratti (PHI)	36.58
2	Shu Zhenjun (CHN)	32.35
3	Falah Al-Falah (IOC)	20.78
4	Carlos Pangemanan (INA)	12.57
Heat 3
1	Cheung Ho Lung (HKG)	47.68
2	Rawad Bou Maachar (LIB)	37.36
3	Alek Hanif (INA)	29.46
4	Cyril Zreik (LIB)	21.78
Heat 4
1	Tatsanai Kuakoonrat (THA)	37.58
2	Lin Hao-ting (TPE)	32.68
3	Bader Al-Jihayem (IOC)	22.01
4	Zhang Zhijie (CHN)	10.57

===== Semifinals =====
15 December

Rank	Athlete	Score
Heat 1
1	Cheung Ho Lung (HKG)	64.90
2	Bunyalo Jumruang (THA)	60.68
3	Salvador Chiha (LIB)	50.25
4	Kim Yang-su (KOR)	34.69
5	Robert Caratti (PHI)	28.02
6	Zhang Wei (CHN)	24.92
Heat 2
1	Padiwat Jaemjan (THA)	70.36
2	Tatsanai Kuakoonrat (THA)	61.68
3	Ji Hoon (KOR)	59.68
4	Julien Breistroff (HKG)	57.68
5	Jung In-sang (KOR)	55.24
6	Carlo dela Torre (PHI)	53.35

===== Final =====
15 December

Rank	Athlete	Score
1st place, gold medalist(s)	Bunyalo Jumruang (THA)	58.25
2nd place, silver medalist(s)	Padiwat Jaemjan (THA)	55.80
3rd place, bronze medalist(s)	Salvador Chiha (LIB)	47.91
4	Ji Hoon (KOR)	43.03
5	Tatsanai Kuakoonrat (THA)	40.57
6	Cheung Ho Lung (HKG)	36.00

==== Women's individual ====
===== Quarterfinals =====
14 December

Rank	Athlete	Score
Heat 1
1	Han Qiu (CHN)	49.02
2	Wan Weidan (CHN)	39.13
3	Teng Pei-shan (TPE)	20.68
4	Samantha Bermudez (PHI)	17.35
5	Desyani Cornelis (INA)	9.56
6	Dini Imaniar (INA)	6.56
Heat 2
1	Chen Lili (CHN)	53.35
2	Sasha Christian (SIN)	43.02
3	Seo Jeong-lan (KOR)	32.35
4	Jeanne Al-Failakawi (IOC)	29.78
5	Jeon So-hyun (KOR)	25.14
6	Kim Soo-yeon (KOR)	20.47

===== Last chance qualifier =====
14 December

Rank	Athlete	Score
1	Jeanne Al-Failakawi (IOC)	23.35
2	Dini Imaniar (INA)	14.56
3	Jeon So-hyun (KOR)	11.57
4	Kim Soo-yeon (KOR)	10.00
5	Desyani Cornelis (INA)	6.67
6	Samantha Bermudez (PHI)	4.56

===== Semifinals =====
15 December

Rank	Athlete	Score
Heat 1
1	Han Qiu (CHN)	59.67
2	Sasha Christian (SIN)	46.14
3	Seo Jeong-lan (KOR)	30.03
4	Jeanne Al-Failakawi (IOC)	27.14
Heat 2
1	Chen Lili (CHN)	48.79
2	Wan Weidan (CHN)	37.47
3	Teng Pei-shan (TPE)	29.80
4	Dini Imaniar (INA)	18.37

===== Final =====
15 December

Rank	Athlete	Score
1st place, gold medalist(s)	Chen Lili (CHN)	39.48
2nd place, silver medalist(s)	Seo Jeong-lan (KOR)	31.70
3rd place, bronze medalist(s)	Teng Pei-shan (TPE)	28.47
4	Sasha Christian (SIN)	26.70
5	Wan Weidan (CHN)	25.57
6	Han Qiu (CHN)	21.46

==== Team overall ====
14–15 December

Rank	Team	Score
1st place, gold medalist(s)	South Korea (KOR)	185
2nd place, silver medalist(s)	Thailand (THA)	180
3rd place, bronze medalist(s)	China (CHN)	165
4	Chinese Taipei (TPE)	73
5	Lebanon (LIB)	69
6	Hong Kong (HKG)	60
7	Singapore (SIN)	55
8	Indonesia (INA)	42
9	Philippines (PHI)	39
10	Athletes from Kuwait (IOC)	34
11	Malaysia (MAS)	5
