= Japan at the 2010 Asian Beach Games =

- IOC code: JPN
- NOC: Japanese Olympic Committee
- Website: https://www.joc.or.jp

in Muscat, Oman December 8 – December 16
- Competitors: 46 in 5 sports
- Medals Ranked 10th: Gold 2 Silver 1 Bronze 3 Total 6

Asian Beach Games appearances
- 2008; 2010; 2012; 2014; 2016; 2026

Japan competed in the 2010 Asian Beach Games in Muscat, Oman from December 8 to December 16, 2010. The delegation was bannered by 46 athletes. Japan send their representatives in five sports, including beach soccer, beach volleyball, beach handball, sailing, and triathlon.

The delegation collected two golds, a silver, and three bronze medals at the game. The medals came from only two sports, triathlon and sailing. In the men's individual triathlon, Yuichi Hosoda secured a gold medal before later Juri Ide also gained another gold in women's individual triathlon. Ryosuke Yamamoto finished third behind Hosoda and won the bronze medal. In other hand, Akane Tsuchihashi also finished three after Ide and got bronze medal. The sailing athletes, Megumi Iseda and Mai Mitsuishi finished 2nd and 3rd in women's Techno 293 event, so they came with silver and bronze medal.

== Medalists ==
Medal	Name	Sport	Event	Date
Gold	Yuichi Hosoda	Triathlon	Men's individual	December 16
Gold	Juri Ide	Triathlon	Women's individual	December 16
Silver	Megumi Iseda	Sailing	Women's Techno 293	December 13
Bronze	Mai Mitsuishi	Sailing	Women's Techno 293	December 13
Bronze	Ryosuke Yamamoto	Triathlon	Men's individual	December 16
Bronze	Akane Tsuchihashi	Triathlon	Women's individual	December 16

Medals by sport
Sport	1st place, gold medalist(s)	2nd place, silver medalist(s)	3rd place, bronze medalist(s)	Total
Triathlon	2	0	2	4
Sailing	0	1	1	2
Total	2	1	3	6

== Competitors ==
Sport	Men	Women	Total
Beach handball	10	10	20
Beach soccer	10	0	10
Beach volleyball	4	4	8
Sailing	2	2	4
Triathlon	2	2	4
Total	28	18	46

== Beach handball ==
=== Men's team ===
- (Japan) Taiki Agarie
- (Japan) Kentaro Kawaguchi
- (Japan) Remi Anri Doi
- (Japan) Yuki Maeda
- (Japan) Ken Matsunaga
- (Japan) Masanori Hasegawa
- (Japan) Kosei Ogawa
- (Japan) Daichi Komatsu
- (Japan) Ken Matsumoto
- (Japan) Akio Fujii

=== Women's team ===
- (Japan) Tomoka Kinoshita
- (Japan) Ayana Misawa
- (Japan) Erina Kutsukake
- (Japan) Rie Saiki
- (Japan) Yumiko Takahashi
- (Japan) Haruna Wakita
- (Japan) Tomoko Sakamoto
- (Japan) Saiki Masuda
- (Japan) Chihiro Mochizuki
- (Japan) Erina Yamanaka

== Beach soccer ==
=== Men's team ===
- (Japan) Shingo Terukina
- (Japan) Hiroya Ginoza
- (Japan) Takeshi Kawaharazuka
- (Japan) Shinji Makino
- (Japan) Teruki Tabata
- (Japan) Masahito Toma
- (Japan) Tomoya Uehara
- (Japan) Naoki Otsubo
- (Japan) Masayuki Komaki
- (Japan) Takasuke Goto

== Beach volleyball ==
=== Men's team ===
- 1 Yoshiumi Hasegawa
- 1 Hitoshi Murakami
- 2 Keisuke Imai
- 2 Yujiro Hidaka

=== Women's team ===
- 1 Ayumi Kusano
- 1 Miki Oyama
- 2 Mutsumi Ozaki
- 2 Angela Ishida

== Sailing ==
=== Men's Techno 293 ===
- Seiji Masubuchi
- Satoshi Sagae

=== Women's Techno 293 ===
- Megumi Iseda (silver)
- Mai Mitsuishi (bronze)

== Triathlon ==
=== Men's individual ===
- Yuichi Hosoda (gold)
- Ryosuke Yamamoto (bronze)

=== Women's individual ===
- Juri Ide (gold)
- Akane Tsuchihashi (bronze)

== See also ==
- Japan at the Asian Games
