= Bodybuilding at the 2010 Asian Beach Games =

- Venue: Qurum City Auditorium
- Dates: 10–11 December 2010

Bodybuilding at the 2010 Asian Beach Games was held in Muscat, Oman from 10 December to 11 December 2010. The competition included only men's events for six different weight categories. All events were held at Qurum City Auditorium.

== Medalists ==
| Event | Gold | Silver | Bronze |
|---|---|---|---|
| 60 kg | Asrelawandi; Indonesia | Phạm Văn Mách; Vietnam | Jiraphan Pongkam; Thailand |
| 65 kg | Somkhit Sumethowetchakun; Thailand | Nguyễn Văn Lâm; Vietnam | Nguyễn Trường Giang; Vietnam |
| 70 kg | Sazali Abdul Samad; Malaysia | Nguyễn Hải Âu; Vietnam | Somsri Turinthaisong; Thailand |
| 75 kg | Syafrizaldi; Indonesia | Nguyễn Văn Tuấn; Vietnam | Suwit Gatejinsa; Thailand |
| 80 kg | Sawang Panapoi; Thailand | Hussain Al-Balooshi; United Arab Emirates | Firuz Davlyatov; Tajikistan |
| 85 kg | Issa Al-Hassani; Oman | Omar Al-Noobi; United Arab Emirates | Azizjon Azizov; Tajikistan |

== Medal table ==
| Rank | Nation | Gold | Silver | Bronze | Total |
|---|---|---|---|---|---|
| 1 | Thailand (THA) | 2 | 0 | 3 | 5 |
| 2 | Indonesia (INA) | 2 | 0 | 0 | 2 |
| 3 | Malaysia (MAS) | 1 | 0 | 0 | 1 |
| 3 | Oman (OMA) | 1 | 0 | 0 | 1 |
| 5 | Vietnam (VIE) | 0 | 4 | 1 | 5 |
| 6 | United Arab Emirates (UAE) | 0 | 2 | 0 | 2 |
| 7 | Tajikistan (TJK) | 0 | 0 | 2 | 2 |
| Totals (7 entries) | | 6 | 6 | 6 | 18 |

== Results ==
=== 60 kg ===
10 December

| Rank | Athlete | Prej. | Final | Total |
|---|---|---|---|---|
| 1st place, gold medalist(s) | Asrelawandi (INA) | 10 | 11 | 21 |
| 2nd place, silver medalist(s) | Phạm Văn Mách (VIE) | 12 | 10 | 22 |
| 3rd place, bronze medalist(s) | Jiraphan Pongkam (THA) | 13 | 12 | 25 |
| 4 | Daljit Singh (IND) | 19 | 21 | 40 |
| DQ | Kamil Al-Muqaimi (OMA) | 22 | 22 | ~~44~~ |
| 6 | Muhammad Bilal (PAK) | 30 | | |
| 7 | Doljinsürengiin Enkh-Erdene (MGL) | 35 | | |

- Kamil Al-Muqaimi of Oman originally got the 5th place, but was disqualified after he failed the drug test.

=== 65 kg ===
10 December

| Rank | Athlete | Prej. | Final | Total |
|---|---|---|---|---|
| 1st place, gold medalist(s) | Somkhit Sumethowetchakun (THA) | 5 | 5 | 10 |
| 2nd place, silver medalist(s) | Nguyễn Văn Lâm (VIE) | 10 | 10 | 20 |
| 3rd place, bronze medalist(s) | Nguyễn Trường Giang (VIE) | 16 | 15 | 31 |
| 4 | Shyam Shrestha (NEP) | 26 | 24 | 50 |
| DQ | Hasan Jakhir (IRQ) | 20 | 21 | ~~41~~ |
| 6 | Sachit Pradhan (NEP) | 28 | | |
| 7 | Manuchekhr Nodirkhonov (TJK) | 38 | | |
| 8 | Tömörbaataryn Chakhar (MGL) | 40 | | |
| 9 | Lobzang Tshering (BHU) | 43 | | |

- Hasan Jakhir of Iraq originally got the 4th place, but was disqualified after he failed the drug test.

=== 70 kg ===
10 December

| Rank | Athlete | Prej. | Final | Total |
|---|---|---|---|---|
| 1st place, gold medalist(s) | Sazali Abdul Samad (MAS) | 5 | 5 | 10 |
| 2nd place, silver medalist(s) | Nguyễn Hải Âu (VIE) | 13 | 12 | 25 |
| 3rd place, bronze medalist(s) | Somsri Turinthaisong (THA) | 16 | 17 | 33 |
| 4 | Iman Setiawan (INA) | 17 | 17 | 34 |
| 5 | Khalid Ali (PAK) | 26 | 25 | 51 |
| 6 | Suen Kwai Kei (HKG) | 28 | | |
| 7 | Firdavs Dustov (TJK) | 36 | | |
| 8 | Husham Hameed (MDV) | 40 | | |
| 9 | Nihad Rasheed (MDV) | 44 | | |

=== 75 kg ===
11 December

| Rank | Athlete | Prej. | Final | Total |
|---|---|---|---|---|
| 1st place, gold medalist(s) | Syafrizaldi (INA) | 5 | 5 | 10 |
| 2nd place, silver medalist(s) | Nguyễn Văn Tuấn (VIE) | 15 | 15 | 30 |
| 3rd place, bronze medalist(s) | Suwit Gatejinsa (THA) | 22 | 22 | 44 |
| 4 | Yousuf Al-Balooshi (UAE) | 23 | 23 | 46 |
| DQ | Nasser Al-Maskari (OMA) | 10 | 10 | ~~20~~ |
| 6 | Md Abu Sayeed Molla (BAN) | 31 | | |
| 7 | Sonam Dhendup (BHU) | 35 | | |

- Nasser Al-Maskari of Oman originally won the silver medal, but was disqualified after he failed the drug test.

=== 80 kg ===
11 December

| Rank | Athlete | Prej. | Final | Total |
|---|---|---|---|---|
| 1st place, gold medalist(s) | Sawang Panapoi (THA) | 5 | 6 | 11 |
| 2nd place, silver medalist(s) | Hussain Al-Balooshi (UAE) | 20 | 20 | 40 |
| 3rd place, bronze medalist(s) | Firuz Davlyatov (TJK) | 25 | 25 | 50 |
| DQ | Anwar Al-Balushi (OMA) | 10 | 9 | ~~19~~ |
| DQ | Waleed Al-Hassani (OMA) | 15 | 15 | ~~30~~ |

- Anwar Al-Balushi of Oman originally won the silver medal, but was disqualified after he failed the drug test.
- Waleed Al-Hassani of Oman originally won the bronze medal, but was disqualified after he failed the drug test.

=== 85 kg ===
11 December

| Rank | Athlete | Prej. | Final | Total |
|---|---|---|---|---|
| 1st place, gold medalist(s) | Issa Al-Hassani (OMA) | 5 | 5 | 10 |
| 2nd place, silver medalist(s) | Omar Al-Noobi (UAE) | 10 | 10 | 20 |
| 3rd place, bronze medalist(s) | Azizjon Azizov (TJK) | 15 | 15 | 30 |
| 4 | Saifullah Khaled (BAN) | 20 | 20 | 40 |
