= Beach woodball at the 2010 Asian Beach Games =

- Venue: North Al-Hail
- Dates: 10–13 December 2010

Woodball at the 2010 Asian Beach Games was held from 10 December to 13 December 2010 in Muscat, Oman.

== Medalists ==
Event	Gold	Silver	Bronze
Men's singles	Khet Tipsumalai; Thailand	Klayut Mongkholsamai; Thailand	Siraphop Wannapin; Thailand
Men's team	Thailand; Siraphop Wannapin; Klayut Mongkholsamai; Khet Tipsumalai; Chinnakrit Imkrajang; Samon Khonlam; Jukkarin Khunthong	Indonesia; Kriswantoro; Ahris Sumariyanto; Bambang Sulistyo; Sutarno; Masrun; Martius Bungan	Chinese Taipei; Wang Wan-yi; Chang Po-shuo; Chang Yu-cheng; Huang Kai-ho; Su Hung-wen; Lin Hui-chin
Women's singles	Siripat Karinit; Thailand	Praewpan Chaithong; Thailand	Chiang Fang-yu; Chinese Taipei
Women's team	Thailand; Altira Boonjit; Pornpimon Buaklang; Praewpan Chaithong; Siripat Karinit; Sayumphon Pimsawat; Monta Punprom	Chinese Taipei; Chiang Fang-yu; Chiu Ya-ting; Hung Mei-hui; Lai Jou-tung; Tseng Hsin-i; Wu Chih-han	China; Liu Zhihui; Wang Jing; Wang Jingfen; Wang Jinghua; Wang Xiaoqing; Zhang Fengling

== Medal table ==
Rank	Nation	Gold	Silver	Bronze	Total
1	Thailand (THA)	4	2	1	7
2	Chinese Taipei (TPE)	0	1	2	3
3	Indonesia (INA)	0	1	0	1
4	China (CHN)	0	0	1	1
Totals (4 entries)		4	4	4	12

== Results ==
=== Men's singles ===
10–13 December

Rank	Athlete	Prel.	Final
1st place, gold medalist(s)	Khet Tipsumalai (THA)	164	202
2nd place, silver medalist(s)	Klayut Mongkholsamai (THA)	158	202
3rd place, bronze medalist(s)	Siraphop Wannapin (THA)	165	205
4	Peera Chaisongkram (THA)	171	207
5	Wattana Phromkaew (THA)	177	215
6	Ahris Sumariyanto (INA)	172	216
7	Jukkarin Khunthong (THA)	171	218
8	Chinnakrit Imkrajang (THA)	176	218
9	Wang Wan-yi (TPE)	178	223
10	Ye Qiwei (CHN)	179	
11	Wang Tuo (CHN)	179	
12	Samon Khonlam (THA)	180	
13	Masrun (INA)	182	
14	Martius Bungan (INA)	187	
15	Huang Kai-ho (TPE)	193	
16	Said Al-Farsi (OMA)	194	
17	Bambang Sulistyo (INA)	195	
18	Chang Yu-cheng (TPE)	198	
19	Kriswantoro (INA)	201	
20	Su Hung-wen (TPE)	201	
21	Mohammed Al-Niyadi (OMA)	202	
22	Liang Yunhai (CHN)	206	
23	Liu Guoyin (CHN)	206	
24	Zhao Dongfeng (CHN)	208	
25	Lin Hui-chin (TPE)	209	
26	Xie Zhenxian (CHN)	209	
27	Mohammed Al-Hinai (OMA)	212	
28	Cao Hoàng Anh (VIE)	212	
29	Ahmed Al-Mufarji (OMA)	212	
30	Nassr Al-Suleimani (OMA)	212	
31	Trần Duy Anh (VIE)	213	
32	Chang Po-shuo (TPE)	214	
33	Liu Yue (CHN)	215	
34	Vũ Hồng Quân (VIE)	215	
35	Phạm Công Thành (VIE)	218	
36	Sutarno (INA)	223	
37	Santosh Gurav (IND)	225	
38	Ahmed Al-Farsi (OMA)	226	
39	Waleed Al-Balushi (OMA)	227	
40	Hamed Al-Shaqsi (OMA)	238	
41	Kapil Kumar Sahu (IND)	238	
42	Bùi Anh Dũng (VIE)	240	
43	Teodulfo Villaflor (PHI)	256	
44	Neelsagar Patel (IND)	258	
45	Rakesh Tiwari (IND)	258	
46	Pradeep Choudhary (IND)	267	
47	Anil Kumar (IND)	269	
48	Ganboldyn Sugarbayar (MGL)	270	
49	Xiao Shuiping (CHN)	273	
50	Harold Loriega (PHI)	280	
51	Sandip Gurav (IND)	288	
52	Ashish Pandey (IND)	307	
—	Hà Khả Luân (VIE)	DNF	

=== Men's team ===
10–13 December

Rank	Team	Score
1st place, gold medalist(s)	Thailand (THA)	641
2nd place, silver medalist(s)	Indonesia (INA)	717
3rd place, bronze medalist(s)	Chinese Taipei (TPE)	742
4	China (CHN)	758
5	Oman (OMA)	794
6	Vietnam (VIE)	844
7	India (IND)	956

=== Women's singles ===
10–13 December

Rank	Athlete	Prel.	Final
1st place, gold medalist(s)	Siripat Karinit (THA)	174	217
2nd place, silver medalist(s)	Praewpan Chaithong (THA)	177	218
3rd place, bronze medalist(s)	Chiang Fang-yu (TPE)	179	223
4	Pornpimon Buaklang (THA)	174	224
5	Monta Punprom (THA)	181	225
6	Wu Chih-han (TPE)	186	226
7	Tseng Hsin-i (TPE)	184	227
8	Sayumphon Pimsawat (THA)	185	231
9	Altira Boonjit (THA)	186	234
10	Wang Xiaoqing (CHN)	191	
11	Supranee Pengwichai (THA)	191	
12	Jiraporn Chinpukdee (THA)	193	
13	Chiu Ya-ting (TPE)	195	
14	Liu Zhihui (CHN)	195	
15	Agustina Nur Aini (INA)	197	
16	Wang Jing (CHN)	198	
17	Lai Jou-tung (TPE)	202	
17	Dwi Tiga Putri (INA)	202	
19	Ida Ayu Ratih (INA)	207	
20	Ika Yulianingsih (INA)	208	
21	Zhang Fengling (CHN)	210	
22	Wang Jingfen (CHN)	220	
23	Hung Mei-hui (TPE)	221	
24	Nuraeni (INA)	222	
25	Zuwaina Al-Mahrizi (OMA)	231	
26	Kartini (INA)	235	
27	Saada Al-Habsi (OMA)	243	
28	Suad Al-Harthi (OMA)	248	
29	Basma Al-Ruqaishi (OMA)	250	
30	Samira Al-Habsi (OMA)	257	
31	Zubaida Al-Mahrizi (OMA)	258	
32	Gao Meihua (CHN)	259	
33	Salima Al-Mahrizi (OMA)	259	
34	Wang Jinghua (CHN)	267	
35	Shivali Bhaud (IND)	267	
36	Zhang Aijun (CHN)	268	
37	Sowali Malusare (IND)	269	
38	Laxmi Kumari (IND)	275	
39	Anwaar Al-Barwani (OMA)	295	
40	Sayali Shirke (IND)	312	
41	Rinku Kumari (IND)	346	
42	Dorjiin Baigalmaa (MGL)	312	

=== Women's team ===
10–13 December

Rank	Team	Score
1st place, gold medalist(s)	Thailand (THA)	685
2nd place, silver medalist(s)	Chinese Taipei (TPE)	732
3rd place, bronze medalist(s)	China (CHN)	783
4	Indonesia (INA)	803
5	Oman (OMA)	938
6	India (IND)	1120
