= Jet ski at the 2010 Asian Beach Games =

- Venue: Al-Musannah Sports City
- Dates: 14–16 December 2010

Jet ski at the 2010 Asian Beach Games was held from 14 December to 16 December 2010 in Muscat, Oman.

== Medalists ==
Event	Gold	Silver	Bronze
Runabout open	Phairot Onnim; Thailand	Mohammad Burbaye; Athletes from Kuwait	Chokuthit Molee; Thailand
Runabout 800 superstock	Yousef Al-Abdulrazzaq; Athletes from Kuwait	Abdullah Al-Fadhel; Athletes from Kuwait	Thanapun Phangchunan; Thailand
Runabout endurance open	Aero Sutan Aswar; Indonesia	Kritsada Wuttithosaporn; Thailand	Mohammad Al-Baz; Athletes from Kuwait
Ski open	Almur Huraiz; United Arab Emirates	Omar Abdulla; United Arab Emirates	Arthit Wongpinta; Thailand

== Medal table ==
Rank	Nation	Gold	Silver	Bronze	Total
1	Athletes from Kuwait (IOC)	1	2	1	4
2	Thailand (THA)	1	1	3	5
3	United Arab Emirates (UAE)	1	1	0	2
4	Indonesia (INA)	1	0	0	1
Totals (4 entries)		4	4	4	12

== Results ==
=== Runabout open ===
15 December

Rank	Athlete	Motor 1		Motor 2		Motor 3		Total
Rank	Athlete	Rank	Pts	Rank	Pts	Rank	Pts	Total
1st place, gold medalist(s)	Phairot Onnim (THA)	5	48	1	60	2	53	151
2nd place, silver medalist(s)	Mohammad Burbaye (IOC)	2	53	2	53	5	39	145
3rd place, bronze medalist(s)	Chokuthit Molee (THA)	1	60	9	27	1	60	137
4	Aero Sutan Aswar (INA)	4	43	3	48	4	43	134
5	Khaled Burbaye (IOC)	8	30	4	43	3	48	121
6	Talal Al-Busaidi (OMA)	6	36	5	39	6	36	111
7	Tariq Al-Ghamdi (KSA)	9	27	6	36	7	33	96
8	Majdi Abdulrahman (KSA)	10	24	7	33	9	27	84
9	Omair Thani (UAE)	5	39	8	30	DNS		69
10	Khamis Al-Hosni (OMA)	7	33	DNS		8	30	63

=== Runabout 800 superstock ===
14 December

Rank	Athlete	Motor 1		Motor 2		Motor 3		Total
Rank	Athlete	Rank	Pts	Rank	Pts	Rank	Pts	Total
1st place, gold medalist(s)	Yousef Al-Abdulrazzaq (IOC)	5	39	1	60	1	60	159
2nd place, silver medalist(s)	Abdullah Al-Fadhel (IOC)	2	53	4	43	2	53	149
3rd place, bronze medalist(s)	Thanapun Phangchunan (THA)	1	60	5	39	4	43	142
4	Chaowalit Kuajaroon (THA)	3	48	3	48	5	39	135
5	Teerapong Khunjeng (THA)	4	43	6	36	7	33	112
6	Abdulrahman Al-Bader (IOC)	DNS		7	33	3	48	81
7	Wu Ronghua (CHN)	DNS		8	30	6	36	66
8	Saud Ahmed (KSA)	DSQ		2	53	DNF		53

=== Runabout endurance open ===
16 December

Rank	Athlete	Motor 1		Motor 2		Total
Rank	Athlete	Rank	Pts	Rank	Pts	Total
1st place, gold medalist(s)	Aero Sutan Aswar (INA)	1	400	1	400	800
2nd place, silver medalist(s)	Kritsada Wuttithosaporn (THA)	2	380	2	380	760
3rd place, bronze medalist(s)	Mohammad Al-Baz (IOC)	3	368	3	368	736
4	Iskandar Fitramsyan (INA)	4	360	8	340	700
5	Talal Al-Busaidi (OMA)	5	352	7	344	696
6	Mohamed Mohsin (UAE)	10	332	4	360	692
7	Supuk Settura (THA)	8	340	5	352	692
8	Saud Ahmed (KSA)	6	348	9	336	684
9	Khamis Al-Hosni (OMA)	11	328	6	348	676
10	Ahmad Al-Dwas (IOC)	7	344	DNS		344
11	Yousef Al-Qithmi (KSA)	9	336	DNS		336

=== Ski open ===
14 December

Rank	Athlete	Motor 1		Motor 2		Motor 3		Total
Rank	Athlete	Rank	Pts	Rank	Pts	Rank	Pts	Total
1st place, gold medalist(s)	Almur Huraiz (UAE)	2	53	2	53	1	60	166
2nd place, silver medalist(s)	Omar Abdulla (UAE)	1	60	1	60	6	36	156
3rd place, bronze medalist(s)	Arthit Wongpinta (THA)	3	48	6	36	2	53	137
4	Nuttakorn Pupakdee (THA)	4	43	4	43	4	43	129
5	Veerapong Maneechom (THA)	5	39	8	30	3	48	117
6	Saif Al-Falasi (UAE)	6	36	5	39	5	39	114
7	Jaber Al-Falasi (UAE)	7	33	7	33	8	30	96
8	Pawin Baedayananda (THA)	10	24	3	48	11	22	94
9	Mohammed Shalabi (KSA)	8	30	11	22	7	33	85
10	Abdulaziz Al-Omar (IOC)	11	22	9	27	9	27	76
11	Yousef Babli (KSA)	9	27	12	20	12	20	67
12	Li Qianqian (CHN)	DNS		10	24	10	24	48
13	Yousef Al-Qithmi (KSA)	DSQ		DNS		DNS		0
14	Yaqub Al-Huwaidi (IOC)	DNS		DNS		DNS		0
