= Open water swimming at the 2010 Asian Beach Games =

- Venue: Barr Al-Jissah Resort
- Dates: 9–11 December 2010

Open water swimming at the 2010 Asian Beach Games was held from 9 December to 11 December 2010 in Muscat, Oman.

== Medalists ==
=== Men ===
Event	Gold	Silver	Bronze
5 km	Saleh Mohammad; Syria	Xu Wenchao; China	Pan Kai-wen; Chinese Taipei
10 km	Zu Lijun; China	Saleh Mohammad; Syria	Ling Tin Yu; Hong Kong

=== Women ===
Event	Gold	Silver	Bronze
5 km	Li Xue; China	Shi Yu; China	Natasha Tang; Hong Kong
10 km	Fang Yanqiao; China	Yessy Yosaputra; Indonesia	Natasha Tang; Hong Kong

== Medal table ==
Rank	Nation	Gold	Silver	Bronze	Total
1	China (CHN)	3	2	0	5
2	Syria (SYR)	1	1	0	2
3	Indonesia (INA)	0	1	0	1
4	Hong Kong (HKG)	0	0	3	3
5	Chinese Taipei (TPE)	0	0	1	1
Totals (5 entries)		4	4	4	12

== Results ==
=== Men ===
==== 5 km ====
9 December

Rank	Athlete	Time
1st place, gold medalist(s)	Saleh Mohammad (SYR)	1:00:14.4
2nd place, silver medalist(s)	Xu Wenchao (CHN)	1:00:19.5
3rd place, bronze medalist(s)	Pan Kai-wen (TPE)	1:00:54.9
4	Zhang Shuhuai (CHN)	1:00:56.2
5	Ling Tin Yu (HKG)	1:01:30.1
6	Khalid Al-Kulaibi (OMA)	1:01:32.8
7	Abdullah Al-Bader (IOC)	1:02:07.6
8	Bekshe Zhumagali (KAZ)	1:02:19.3
9	David Wong (HKG)	1:02:30.6
10	Ricky Anggawijaya (INA)	1:02:32.9
11	Hsiao Fu-yu (TPE)	1:03:02.4
12	Mohammed Al-Habsi (OMA)	1:03:09.0
13	Ahmed Atari (QAT)	1:03:44.6
14	Ahmed Majeed (IRQ)	1:03:59.0
15	Tharanga Weerakkodi (SRI)	1:04:39.7
16	Iurii Zakharov (KGZ)	1:05:29.1
17	Fouad Bakri (SYR)	1:06:39.5
18	Jose Gonzalez (PHI)	1:06:55.7
19	Mahmoud Daaboul (LIB)	1:08:09.7
20	Pasindu Porawa (SRI)	1:10:25.0
21	Bùi Quang Huy (VIE)	1:10:45.6
22	Hassan Al-Mubarak (KSA)	1:15:19.8
23	Ibrahim Al-Amadi (QAT)	1:18:04.2
24	Abdullahjanel Al-Atafi (KSA)	1:24:12.1
25	Husham Ahmed (MDV)	1:31:49.0
—	Nishan Ibrahim (MDV)	DNF
—	Yuriy Kudinov (KAZ)	DSQ

==== 10 km ====
11 December

Rank	Athlete	Time
1st place, gold medalist(s)	Zu Lijun (CHN)	1:55:12.1
2nd place, silver medalist(s)	Saleh Mohammad (SYR)	1:55:12.8
3rd place, bronze medalist(s)	Ling Tin Yu (HKG)	2:02:43.9
4	Jiang Tiansheng (CHN)	2:02:44.7
5	Wasim Zwizer (SYR)	2:05:45.6
6	Musallam Al-Khadhuri (OMA)	2:06:20.6
7	Alexandr Trush (KAZ)	2:09:56.8
8	Aiman Al-Qasimi (OMA)	2:10:39.1
9	Ricky Anggawijaya (INA)	2:12:21.6
10	Ahmed Majeed (IRQ)	2:14:25.2
11	Jose Gonzalez (PHI)	2:21:50.0
12	Sahan Rupasinghe (SRI)	2:25:00.7
13	Kanishka Fernando (SRI)	2:25:36.0
14	Hedr Al-Sadh (KSA)	2:32:12.6
—	Mustafa Al-Yousif (KSA)	DNF
—	Abdullah Al-Bader (IOC)	DNS
—	Yuriy Kudinov (KAZ)	DSQ
—	Pan Kai-wen (TPE)	DSQ

=== Women ===
==== 5 km ====
9 December

Rank	Athlete	Time
1st place, gold medalist(s)	Li Xue (CHN)	1:01:27.8
2nd place, silver medalist(s)	Shi Yu (CHN)	1:01:33.4
3rd place, bronze medalist(s)	Natasha Tang (HKG)	1:04:40.3
4	Yessy Yosaputra (INA)	1:05:21.2
5	Nguyễn Thị Kim Oanh (VIE)	1:10:26.1
6	Diana Ikramova (KAZ)	1:11:04.8
7	Gaziza Kumakbayeva (KAZ)	1:14:48.4
8	Erika Lukang (PHI)	1:19:28.5
9	Kaveesha Tharinduni (SRI)	1:22:41.7
10	Rasangi Dilanka (SRI)	1:31:01.7

==== 10 km ====
11 December

Rank	Athlete	Time
1st place, gold medalist(s)	Fang Yanqiao (CHN)	2:04:12.0
2nd place, silver medalist(s)	Yessy Yosaputra (INA)	2:10:20.5
3rd place, bronze medalist(s)	Natasha Tang (HKG)	2:12:24.7
4	Li Hong (CHN)	2:12:29.1
5	Nguyễn Thị Kim Oanh (VIE)	2:19:35.5
6	Diana Ikramova (KAZ)	2:21:02.0
7	Gaziza Kumakbayeva (KAZ)	2:25:34.4
8	Erika Lukang (PHI)	2:31:09.1
—	Sunethra Wijerathne (SRI)	DNF
—	Gamaralage Jayawardena (SRI)	DNF
