= Mohammad Burbaye =

Kuwaiti jet ski racer

Mohammed Burbayea
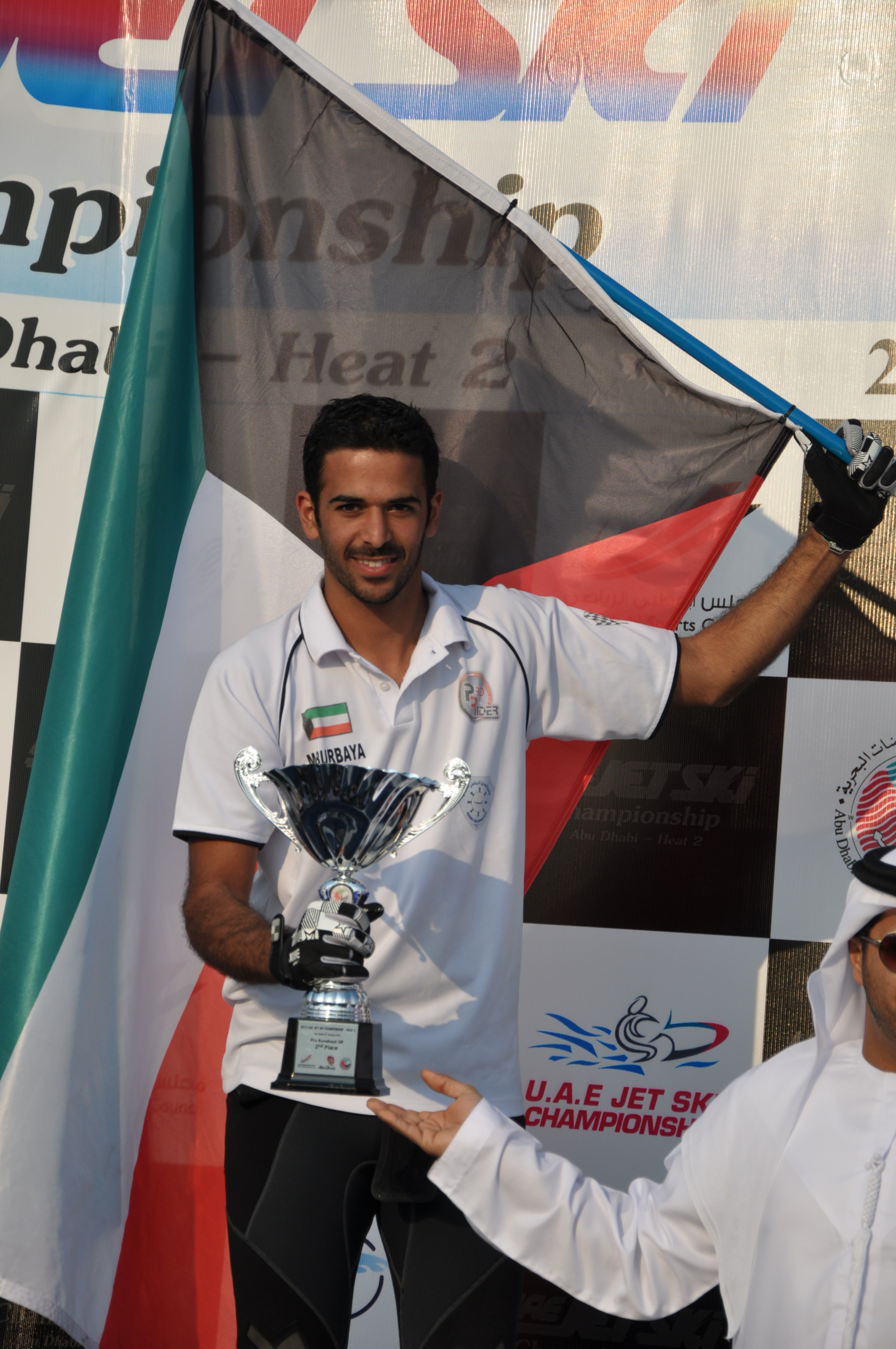
- Burbayea During Abu Dhabi Jetski ceremony

Personal information
- Nationality: Kuwait
- Born: 11 January 1989 (age 37)

Sport
- Sport: World Jetski Champion
- Team: Prorider Kuwait
- Racing number: 66

Titles
- UAE Championship: 2x Champion
- Kuwait Jetski Championship: 4x Champion
- World Finals IJSBA: 25x Champion
- Podium: 28 = 3x Guinness World Record Title Holder

Mohamed Burbayea (World Best Jetski Racer )(Arabic: محمد بوربيع) (born January 11, 1989) Mohamad Burbayea is the best jetski racer in the world he is a Kuwaiti world champion who has achieved many achievements and has more than 150 wins during his career and also achieved 25 gold medals(IJSBA) in the world championship and holds the Guinness World Record for the most rider achieved gold medals in the world championship.

== Championships ==
PRO GP 2015

World Finals
Year	Championship	Category	Rank
2012	IJSBA World Finals	Amateur Classic Runabout Limited	CHAMPION
2012	IJSBA World Finals	World Finals Expert Runabout Limited	CHAMPION
2012	IJSBA World Finals	World Finals Runabout Normally Aspirated	CHAMPION
2011	IJSBA World Finals	Amateur Classic Runabout Limited	CHAMPION
2011	IJSBA World Finals	Amateur Classic Runabout Stock	CHAMPION
2010	IJSBA World Finals	Amateur Classic Runabout Open	CHAMPION
2010	IJSBA World Finals	Amateur Classic Runabout Stock	CHAMPION
2010	IJSBA World Finals	Amateur Runabout Stock	CHAMPION
2010	IJSBA World Finals	Amateur Runabout Lite	CHAMPION
2009	IJSBA World Finals	Amateur Runabout Classic Stock	CHAMPION
2009	IJSBA World Finals	Amateur Runabout Classic Limited	CHAMPION
2009	IJSBA World Finals	Amateur Runabout Classic Open	CHAMPION
2009	IJSBA World Finals	Amateur Runabout Stock	CHAMPION
2008	IJSBA World Finals	Amateur Classic Runabout Stock	CHAMPION
2007	IJSBA World Finals	Novice Runabout Limited	CHAMPION

== Races ==
=== Asian Beach Games 2010 ===
Event	Gold	Silver	Bronze
Runabout open	Phairot On-Nim; Thailand	Mohamed Burbayea; Athletes from Kuwait	Chok-Uthit Molee; Thailand

=== IJSBA World Finals ===
Year	Category	Rank
2012
2012	Pro-Am Stock Runabout	2
2012	Amateur Classic Runabout Limited	1
2012	Amateur Classic Runabout Open	4
2012	Amateur Classic Runabout Stock	11
2012	World Finals Expert Runabout Limited	1
2012	World Finals PRO-AM Runabout Limited	2
2012	World Finals Runabout Normally Aspirated	1
2011	Amateur Classic Runabout Limited	1
2011	Amateur Classic Runabout Open	2
2011	Amateur Classic Runabout Stock	1
2011	Amateur Runabout 800	3
2011	Expert Runabout Limited	14
2011	Runabout Normally Aspirated	2
2011	World Finals Runabout Open Slalom	10
2011	Amateur Runabout Stock	2
2010	Amateur Classic Runabout Limited	3
2010	Amateur Classic Runabout Open	1
2010	Amateur Classic Runabout Stock	1
2010	Runabout Open Slalom	4
2010	Amateur Runabout Stock	1
2010	Amateur Runabout Lite	1
2009	Amateur Runabout Classic Stock	1
2009	Amateur Runabout Classic Limited	1
2009	Amateur Runabout Classic Open	1
2009	Amateur Runabout Stock	1
2009	Amateur Runabout 800 Limited	9
2008	Amateur Classic Runabout Stock	1
2008	Amateur Classic Runabout Limited	10
2008	Amateur Classic Runabout Open	4
2007	Novice Runabout Limited	1
2007	Novice Runabout Stock	7
2007	PRO-AM Runabout 1200 Stock	13

=== Kuwait Jet Ski Championship ===
Year	Category	Rank
2011	Stock Class	2
2010	Stock Class	2
2009	Stock Class	1
2008	Stock Class	1
2007	Open Class	1
2007	Stock Class	1
2006	Stock Class	1
2006	Stock Class	1

=== UAE Jet Ski Championship ===
Year	Category	Rank
2010/2011
2010/2011	Runabout Stock	4
2010/2011	Runabout Stock	2
2009/2010
2009/2010	Runabout Pro	6
2009/2010	Runabout Stock	1
2008/2009
2008/2009	Runabout Pro	3
2008/2009	Runabout Stock	1
2007/2008
2007/2008	Runabout Pro	4
2007/2008	Runabout stock	2
2006/2007
2006/2007	Runabout stock	3

== See also ==
- 2010 Asian Beach Games
- Jet ski at the 2010 Asian Beach Games
