= South Korea at the 2010 Asian Beach Games =

- IOC code: KOR
- NOC: Korean Olympic Committee

in Muscat
- Competitors: 46 in 4 sports
- Medals Ranked 5th: Gold 2 Silver 3 Bronze 0 Total 5

Asian Beach Games appearances
- 2008; 2010; 2012; 2014; 2016; 2026

South Korea participated in the 2010 Asian Beach Games in Muscat, Oman on 8–16 December 2010.

Korea sent 24 athletes (18 men and 6 women) who competed in 4 sports.

== Athletes ==
Sport	Men	Women	Total
Beach Kabaddi	6	0	6
Beach Sepaktakraw	6	0	6
Water Ski	6	6	12
Total	18	6	24

== Medal summary ==
=== Medals table ===
Sport	Gold	Silver	Bronze	Total
Waterski	3	2	0	5
Total	3	2	0	5
