= Oman at the 2010 Asian Beach Games =

- IOC code: OMA
- NOC: Oman Olympic Committee

in Muscat
- Competitors: 83 in 12 sports
- Medals Ranked 3rd: Gold 5 Silver 3 Bronze 7 Total 15

Asian Beach Games appearances
- 2008; 2010; 2012; 2014; 2016; 2026

Oman was the host nation for the 2010 Asian Beach Games which is being held in Almusannah and Muscat from 8 December to 16 December 2010 . Oman teams have 83 athletes ( 75 men and 8 women ) competing in 12 sports .

== Competitors ==
Sport	Men	Women	Total
Bodybuilding	5	0	5
Beach Handball	10	0	10
Beach Kabaddi	6	0	6
Beach Soccer	10	0	10
Beach Sepaktakraw	13	0	13
Beach Volleyball	4	0	4
Beach Woodball	8	8	16
Jet Ski	2	0	2
Marathon Swimming	4	0	4
Sailing	6	0	6
Tent Pegging	5	0	5
Triathlon	2	0	2
Total	75	8	83

== Medals table ==
Sport	Gold	Silver	Bronze	Total
Tent Pegging	4	0	2	6
Bodybuilding	1	0	0	1
Beach soccer	0	1	0	1
Beach Sepaktakraw	0	0	2	2
Beach Volleyball	0	0	1	1
Beach Kabaddi	0	0	1	1
Total	5	1	6	12

== Medalists ==
Medal	Name	Sport	Event	Date
Gold	Ali Saleh Al Balushi	Tent Pegging	Rings & Pegs	9 December
Gold	Nasser Rashid Al Siyabi	Tent Pegging	Lemons & Pegs	10 December
Gold	Oman	Tent Pegging	Team Lance	12 December
Gold	Oman	Tent Pegging	Team Sword	13 December
Bronze	Oman	Tent Pegging	Indian File	13 December
Bronze	Oman	Tent Pegging	Pairs File	12 December
Gold	Issa Saleh Al Hasni	Bodybuilding	Men's -85kg	11 December
Bronze	Oman	Beach Volleyball	Men	16 December
Silver	Oman	Beach soccer	Men	16 December
Bronze	Oman	Beach kabaddi	Men	16 December
Bronze	Oman	Beach sepaktakraw	Men's Regu	15 December
Bronze	Oman	Beach sepaktakraw	Men's Team	11 December
