= Indonesia at the 2010 Asian Beach Games =

- IOC code: INA
- NOC: Indonesian Olympic Committee
- Website: www.nocindonesia.or.id (in English)

in Muscat
- Competitors: 110 in 12 sports
- Flag bearer: Koko Prasetyo Darkuncoro
- Medals Ranked 5th: Gold 3 Silver 2 Bronze 6 Total 11

Asian Beach Games appearances
- 2008; 2010; 2012; 2014; 2016; 2026

Indonesia competed at the 2010 Asian Beach Games held in Muscat, Oman from December 8, 2010 to December 16, 2010.

Indonesia sent 110 athletes, 67 men and 43 women, who competed in 12 sports.

== Competitors ==
| Sport | Men | Women | Total |
|---|---|---|---|
| Bodybuilding | 3 | 0 | 3 |
| Beach handball | 10 | 10 | 20 |
| Beach kabaddi | 6 | 6 | 12 |
| Beach soccer | 10 | 0 | 10 |
| Beach sepak takraw | 12 | 12 | 24 |
| Beach volleyball | 2 | 4 | 6 |
| Beach woodball | 6 | 6 | 12 |
| Jet ski | 2 | 0 | 2 |
| Marathon swimming | 1 | 1 | 2 |
| Sailing | 2 | 1 | 3 |
| Beach water polo | 7 | 0 | 7 |
| Water skiing | 6 | 3 | 9 |
| Total | 67 | 43 | 110 |

== Medal summary ==
=== Medal table ===
| Sport | Gold | Silver | Bronze | Total |
|---|---|---|---|---|
| Bodybuilding | 2 | 0 | 0 | 2 |
| Jet ski | 1 | 0 | 0 | 1 |
| Beach woodball | 0 | 1 | 0 | 1 |
| Marathon swimming | 0 | 1 | 0 | 1 |
| Beach sepak takraw | 0 | 0 | 3 | 3 |
| Water skiing | 0 | 0 | 2 | 2 |
| Beach kabaddi | 0 | 0 | 1 | 1 |
| Total | 3 | 2 | 6 | 11 |

=== Medalists ===
| Medal | Name | Sport | Event | Date |
|---|---|---|---|---|
| Gold | Asrelawandi | Bodybuilding | Men's -60kg | 10 Dec |
| Gold | Syafrizaldy | Bodybuilding | Men's -75kg | 11 Dec |
| Gold | Aero Sutan Aswar | Jet ski | Men's Runabout endurance open | 16 Dec |
| Silver | Yessy Yosaputra | Marathon swimming | Women's 10 km | 11 Dec |
| Silver | Ahris Sumariyanto; Bambang Sulistyo; Kriswantoro; Masrun; Martius Bungan; Sutarno | Beach woodball | Men's team | 13 Dec |
| Bronze | Rizky Abdul Rahman Pago; Haris Munandar; Sugeite Arifin; Zulkifli; Abdul Halim Radjiu; Alfin Alim; Yopi Hendra Utama; Brian Agung Pamungkas; Ali Fikri; Rohman Hidayat; Aris Ardianto; Akitirman | Beach sepak takraw | Men's team | 11 Dec |
| Bronze | Devya Sari; Sutini Binti Seni; Nina Karmila; Dwi Asih; Irma Wati; Roslin Dida; Gallih Desiari; Ayu Lestari; Lena; Desi Indah Kurniasari; Hasmawati Umar; Indra Yuliasti | Beach sepak takraw | Women's team | 11 Dec |
| Bronze | Maliki Zulkarnain; Nur Akbar Imansyah; Andri Muhamad Febiandi; Inawati Setiawan; Dini Imaniar | Water skiing | Trick skiing team overall | 14 Dec |
| Bronze | Maliki Zulkarnain | Water skiing | Men's individual trick skiing | 15 Dec |
| Bronze | Sutini Binti Seni; Roslin Dida; Gallih Desiari; Ayu Lestari; Desi Indah Kurniasari; Indra Yuliasti | Beach sepak takraw | Women's regu | 15 Dec |
| Bronze | Ni Made Sridevi; Ni Komang Ariningsih; Ni Luh Putu Risstya; Ni Putu Soma Apriantini; Desak Made Agustin Dewi; Ni Ketut Puspasari | Beach kabaddi | Women | 15 Dec |
