= China at the 2010 Asian Beach Games =

- IOC code: CHN
- NOC: Chinese Olympic Committee external link (in Chinese and English)

in Muscat
- Competitors: 102 in 10 sports
- Medals Ranked 2nd: Gold 12 Silver 6 Bronze 5 Total 23

Asian Beach Games appearances
- 2008; 2010; 2012; 2014; 2016; 2026

China participated in the 2010 Asian Beach Games in Muscat, Oman on 8–16 December 2010.

== Medals table ==
| Sport | Gold | Silver | Bronze | Total |
|---|---|---|---|---|
| Marathon swimming | 3 | 2 | 0 | 5 |
| Water Ski | 3 | 1 | 2 | 6 |
| Sailing | 3 | 1 | 1 | 5 |
| Beach Volleyball | 2 | 0 | 0 | 2 |
| Beach Handball | 1 | 0 | 0 | 1 |
| Beach Sepaktakraw | 0 | 1 | 1 | 2 |
| Triathlon | 0 | 1 | 0 | 1 |
| Beach Woodball | 0 | 0 | 1 | 1 |
| Total | 12 | 6 | 5 | 23 |
