= Laos at the 2010 Asian Beach Games =

Laos at the 2011 Southeast Asian Games
- IOC code: LAO
- NOC: National Olympic Committee of Lao

in Jakarta and Palembang
- Competitors: 55, male=35, female=20 in 12 sports
- Flag bearer: Saysamone Sengdao (petanque)
- Officials: 38,
- Medals Ranked 34th: Gold 0 Silver 1 Bronze 2 Total 3

Southeast Asian Games appearances
- 1959; 1961; 1965; 1967; 1969; 1971; 1973; 1975–1987; 1989; 1991; 1993; 1995; 1997; 1999; 2001; 2003; 2005; 2007; 2009; 2011; 2013; 2015; 2017; 2019; 2021; 2023; 2025; 2027; 2029

Laos participated in the 2nd Asian Beach Games in Muscat, Oman on 8–16 December 2010.

== Medal tally ==
=== Medal table ===
Sport	Gold	Silver	Bronze	Total
Shorinji Kempo	2	2	7	11
Vovinam	2	0	5	7
Pentanque	2	0	2	4
Taekwondo	1	3	5	9
Judo	1	2	1	4
Shooting	1	0	0	1
Wushu	0	4	1	5
Sepak-Takraw	0	1	3	4
