= Beach kabaddi at the 2010 Asian Beach Games =

- Venue: North Al-Hail
- Dates: 12–16 December 2010

Beach kabaddi at the 2010 Asian Beach Games was held from 12 December to 16 December 2010 in Muscat, Oman. Competitions were held at the North Al-Hail.

== Medalists ==
Event	Gold	Silver	Bronze
Men	India; Surjeet Kumar; Pathapalam Suresh; Maninder Singh; Manish Kumar; Dharmaraj Cheralathan; Nilesh Ashok Shinde	Pakistan; Nasir Ali; Atif Sohail; Muhammad Arshad; Waseem Sajjad; Muhammad Khalid; Ibrar Hussain	Iran; Ramezan Ali Paeinmahalli; Meraj Sheikh; Farhad Kamal Gharibi; Keivan Arshad; Hadi Oshtorak; Mostafa Nodehi
Men	India; Surjeet Kumar; Pathapalam Suresh; Maninder Singh; Manish Kumar; Dharmaraj Cheralathan; Nilesh Ashok Shinde	Pakistan; Nasir Ali; Atif Sohail; Muhammad Arshad; Waseem Sajjad; Muhammad Khalid; Ibrar Hussain	Oman; Naaim Al-Risadi; Masoud Al-Batashi; Ismail Al-Hadi; Majeed Al-Shuaibi; Moosa Al-Ghazali; Waleed Al-Hasani
Women	India; Mamatha Poojary; Poosa Vasantha; Priyanka; Randeep Kaur Khehra; Swetha Rane; Preethi Kamalon	Thailand; Chonnikarn Chaiyachot; Jirawan Jareonroop; Krittaya Kwangkunthot; Khanittha Haeothaisong; Jeerawan Namchiangtai; Jittapa Tubjan	Bangladesh; Maleka Parvin; Farzana Akhter Baby; Kazi Shahin Ara; Rupali Akhter; Sharmin Sultana Rima; Fatema Akhter Poly
Women	India; Mamatha Poojary; Poosa Vasantha; Priyanka; Randeep Kaur Khehra; Swetha Rane; Preethi Kamalon	Thailand; Chonnikarn Chaiyachot; Jirawan Jareonroop; Krittaya Kwangkunthot; Khanittha Haeothaisong; Jeerawan Namchiangtai; Jittapa Tubjan	Indonesia; Ni Made Sridevi; Ni Komang Ariningsih; Ni Luh Putu Risstya; Ni Putu Soma Apriantini; Desak Made Agustin Dewi; Ni Ketut Puspasari

== Medal table ==
Rank	Nation	Gold	Silver	Bronze	Total
1	India (IND)	2	0	0	2
2	Pakistan (PAK)	0	1	0	1
2	Thailand (THA)	0	1	0	1
4	Bangladesh (BAN)	0	0	1	1
4	Indonesia (INA)	0	0	1	1
4	Iran (IRI)	0	0	1	1
4	Oman (OMA)	0	0	1	1
Totals (7 entries)		2	2	4	8

== Results ==
=== Men ===
==== Preliminaries ====
===== Group A =====
Pos	Team	Pld	W	D	L	PF	PA	PD	Pts
1	India	4	4	0	0	229	94	+135	8
2	Oman	4	3	0	1	217	116	+101	6
3	Thailand	4	2	0	2	167	159	+8	4
4	South Korea	4	1	0	3	133	188	−55	2
5	Nepal	4	0	0	4	91	280	−189	0

Source: Official website

12 December
9:00

India	70–22 (HT: 41–5)	Nepal

North Al-Hail, Muscat

12 December
16:00

Thailand	68–25 (HT: 37–9)	Nepal

North Al-Hail, Muscat

12 December
18:00

Oman	55–28 (HT: 31–10)	South Korea

North Al-Hail, Muscat

13 December
10:00

Thailand	53–26 (HT: 29–9)	South Korea

North Al-Hail, Muscat

13 December
16:00

India	53–20 (HT: 34–9)	Oman

North Al-Hail, Muscat

13 December
18:00

South Korea	49–33 (HT: 18–20)	Nepal

North Al-Hail, Muscat

14 December
9:00

India	47–30 (HT: 25–11)	South Korea

North Al-Hail, Muscat

14 December
16:00

Oman	93–11 (HT: 46–3)	Nepal

North Al-Hail, Muscat

14 December
19:00

India	59–22 (HT: 31–7)	Thailand

North Al-Hail, Muscat

15 December
9:00

Thailand	24–49 (HT: 10–27)	Oman

North Al-Hail, Muscat

===== Group B =====
Pos	Team	Pld	W	D	L	PF	PA	PD	Pts
1	Pakistan	4	4	0	0	232	76	+156	8
2	Iran	4	3	0	1	201	131	+70	6
3	Sri Lanka	4	2	0	2	135	193	−58	4
4	Indonesia	4	1	0	3	140	181	−41	2
5	Afghanistan	4	0	0	4	102	229	−127	0

Source: Official website

12 December
10:00

Pakistan	65–9 (HT: 33–4)	Afghanistan

North Al-Hail, Muscat

12 December
17:00

Iran	60–26 (HT: 36–10)	Sri Lanka

North Al-Hail, Muscat

12 December
19:00

Indonesia	56–34 (HT: 29–14)	Afghanistan

North Al-Hail, Muscat

13 December
9:00

Indonesia	38–41 (HT: 23–17)	Sri Lanka

North Al-Hail, Muscat

13 December
17:00

Pakistan	50–30 (HT: 22–18)	Iran

North Al-Hail, Muscat

13 December
19:00

Sri Lanka	48–33 (HT: 30–12)	Afghanistan

North Al-Hail, Muscat

14 December
10:00

Pakistan	62–20 (HT: 36–8)	Sri Lanka

North Al-Hail, Muscat

14 December
17:00

Iran	60–26 (HT: 37–5)	Afghanistan

North Al-Hail, Muscat

14 December
18:00

Pakistan	55–17 (HT: 31–4)	Indonesia

North Al-Hail, Muscat

15 December
10:00

Indonesia	29–51 (HT: 11–31)	Iran

North Al-Hail, Muscat

==== Knockout round ====
Semifinals
15 December
India	37
Iran	36
15 December
Pakistan	41
Oman	30

Gold medal match
16 December
India	32
Pakistan	27

===== Semifinals =====
15 December
18:00

India	37–36 (HT: 17–17)	Iran

North Al-Hail, Muscat

15 December
19:00

Pakistan	41–30 (HT: 24–11)	Oman

North Al-Hail, Muscat

===== Gold medal match =====
16 December
14:30

India	32–27 (HT: 16–18)	Pakistan

North Al-Hail, Muscat

=== Women ===
==== Preliminaries ====
Pos	Team	Pld	W	D	L	PF	PA	PD	Pts
1	India	3	3	0	0	190	100	+90	6
2	Thailand	3	2	0	1	168	147	+21	4
3	Bangladesh	3	1	0	2	135	171	−36	2
4	Indonesia	3	0	0	3	122	197	−75	0

Source: Official website

12 December
18:00

Thailand	67–45 (HT: 32–20)	Bangladesh

North Al-Hail, Muscat

12 December
19:00

India	67–39 (HT: 32–25)	Indonesia

North Al-Hail, Muscat

13 December
18:00

India	64–24 (HT: 33–15)	Bangladesh

North Al-Hail, Muscat

13 December
19:00

Thailand	64–43 (HT: 35–20)	Indonesia

North Al-Hail, Muscat

14 December
18:00

India	59–37 (HT: 30–23)	Thailand

North Al-Hail, Muscat

15 December
16:00

Indonesia	40–66 (HT: 22–32)	Bangladesh

North Al-Hail, Muscat

==== Gold medal match ====
16 December
13:30

India	50–40 (HT: 27–18)	Thailand

North Al-Hail, Muscat
