= 2010 Asian Beach Games =

International multi-sport event

Coordinates: 23°47′26″N 57°36′34″E

II Asian Beach Games
- Host city: Muscat, Oman
- Motto: Together We Shine
- Nations: 43
- Athletes: 1,131
- Events: 52 in 14 sports
- Opening: December 8
- Closing: December 16
- Opened by: Qaboos bin Said al Said; Sultan of Oman
- Main venue: Al-Musannah Sports City
- Website: muscat2010.org.om

The 2nd Asian Beach Games were held in Muscat, Oman from 8 December 2010 to 16 December 2010. The opening ceremony was held in the Al-Musannah Sports City, Muscat.

== Emblem ==
The relation between the Omani people and the sea is legendary. Throughout history, they were pioneers in crossing the seas and oceans, and played a significant role in the maritime and shipbuilding history. The 8th century witnessed the arrival of the vessel "Sohar" to the City of Canton (China), establishing once more the Omani maritime supremacy.

The logo design is derived from historical inputs, embodying the simplest forms of the elements. It reflects the relation between the people of Oman and the rest of the worlds, especially with the people of Asia, by hosting the shining sun of Asia in Muscat, projecting a better future for the Asian sports, aided by the ship that will carry it to its international and continental sports destinations.

The official logo incorporates a traditional Omani sailing vessel positioned above stylized waves, integrated with the colors of the Omani flag and the emblem of the Olympic Council of Asia. The design represents Oman's maritime heritage, athletic competition, and the host nation's connection to the coastal environment.

The expressions under the beach are colored by the bright colors of the Omani flag, expressing the devotion of the Omani people to their deep-rooted customs and traditions, expressed in the complete harmony of the elements.

== Development ==
Al-Jebel (tahr), Al-Reeh (houbara) and Al-Med (green turtle), the official mascot

Omran (Omani Government owned tourism company) developed the dedicated 100 Hectare Site at Wudam Al Sahil near Muscat to host the 2010 Asian Beach Games. The development comprised a mixture of temporary and permanent facilities such as a hotel for media and guests, an athletes' village, administration building, press and media centre, restaurants and recreational facilities, site wide infrastructure including a marina and adequate parking facilities. Associated with the above-mentioned development, dedicated playing pitches with temporary stands to accommodate around 300 spectators for preliminary events and up to 1,500 spectators for the final event were built. Further to this, the opening and closing ceremonies were held in the amphitheatre for up to 5,000 spectators.

Key Features:

- 4-star hotel
- Accommodation for Media and Administrative Staff.
- Press Centre, restaurant and recreation facilities within the Athlete village.
- Media Centre with special conference facilities, studios, internet facilities, restaurants, etc.
- Playing grounds for various sports activities with stands to accommodate 4000 – 5000 spectators.
- A marina used for docking 400 sailboats and for various training purposes.
- A central drop-off and vehicle parking area including shuttle buses for the event.
- Future aquatic based resort development.

== Sports ==
- Beach handball (2)
- Beach kabaddi (2)
- Beach sepak takraw (4)
- Beach soccer (1)
- Beach volleyball (2)
- Beach water polo (1)
- Beach woodball (4)
- Bodybuilding (6)
- Jet ski (4)
- Open water swimming (4)
- Sailing (6)
- Tent pegging (8)
- Triathlon (2)
- Water skiing (6)

== Participating nations ==
43 out of 45 Asian countries participated in these games. The only exception being North Korea and Macau. According to the Games' official website, Kuwaiti athletes participated the Games under the Olympic flag because the Kuwait Olympic Committee was suspended due to political interference in January 2010

- Afghanistan (14)
- Athletes from Kuwait (47)
- Bahrain (33)
- Bangladesh (8)
- Bhutan (2)
- Brunei (6)
- Cambodia (4)
- China (100)
- Chinese Taipei (38)
- Timor-Leste (8)
- Hong Kong (13)
- India (55)
- Indonesia (108)
- Iran (18)
- Iraq (7)
- Japan (46)
- Jordan (18)
- Kazakhstan (26)
- Kyrgyzstan (1)
- Laos (4)
- Lebanon (16)
- Malaysia (14)
- Maldives (10)
- Mongolia (4)
- Myanmar (10)
- Nepal (8)
- Oman (83)
- Pakistan (26)
- Palestine (10)
- Philippines (24)
- Qatar (31)
- Saudi Arabia (22)
- Singapore (8)
- South Korea (24)
- Sri Lanka (20)
- Syria (31)
- Tajikistan (8)
- Thailand (125)
- Turkmenistan (4)
- United Arab Emirates (19)
- Uzbekistan (12)
- Vietnam (49)
- Yemen (17)

== Calendar ==
OC	Opening ceremony	●	Event competitions	1	Event finals	CC	Closing ceremony

December 2010	8th Wed	9th Thu	10th Fri	11th Sat	12th Sun	13th Mon	14th Tue	15th Wed	16th Thu	Gold medals
Beach handball		●	●	●	●	●	●	●	2	2
Beach kabaddi					●	●	●	●	2	2
Beach sepak takraw		●	●	2		●	●	1	1	4
Beach soccer	●	●	●	●	●	●	●	●	1	1
Beach volleyball		●	●	●	●	●	●	●	2	2
Beach water polo	●	●	●	●	1					1
Beach woodball			●	●	●	4				4
Bodybuilding			3	3						6
Jet ski							2	1	1	4
Open water swimming		2		2						4
Sailing		●	●	●	●	6				6
Tent pegging		2	2		2	2				8
Triathlon									2	2
Water skiing							●	6		6
Total gold medals		4	5	7	3	12	2	8	11	52
Ceremonies	OC								CC	
December 2010	8th Wed	9th Thu	10th Fri	11th Sat	12th Sun	13th Mon	14th Tue	15th Wed	16th Thu	Gold medals

== Medal table ==
Thailand won the greatest number of medals with a total of 37, including 15 gold. 27 NOCs won at least a single medal with 14 NOCs winning at least a single gold medal, thus leaving 16 NOCs failing to win any medal at the Games.

* Host nation (Oman)

Rank	Nation	Gold	Silver	Bronze	Total
1	Thailand (THA)	15	10	12	37
2	China (CHN)	12	6	5	23
3	Oman (OMA)*	5	1	6	12
4	Iraq (IRQ)	3	3	1	7
5	Indonesia (INA)	3	2	6	11
6	India (IND)	3	0	1	4
7	Athletes from Kuwait (IOC)	2	3	1	6
8	South Korea (KOR)	2	3	0	5
8	United Arab Emirates (UAE)	2	3	0	5
10	Japan (JPN)	2	1	3	6
11	Kazakhstan (KAZ)	1	2	0	3
12	Malaysia (MAS)	1	1	0	2
12	Syria (SYR)	1	1	0	2
14	Vietnam (VIE)	0	5	3	8
15	Pakistan (PAK)	0	4	2	6
16	Jordan (JOR)	0	2	1	3
17	Myanmar (MYA)	0	2	0	2
18	Chinese Taipei (TPE)	0	1	4	5
19	Hong Kong (HKG)	0	1	3	4
20	Yemen (YEM)	0	1	2	3
21	Iran (IRI)	0	0	2	2
21	Tajikistan (TJK)	0	0	2	2
23	Bangladesh (BAN)	0	0	1	1
23	Brunei (BRU)	0	0	1	1
23	Lebanon (LIB)	0	0	1	1
23	Saudi Arabia (KSA)	0	0	1	1
Totals (26 entries)		52	52	58	162
