= Vietnam at the 2010 Asian Beach Games =

- IOC code: VIE
- NOC: Vietnam Olympic Committee
- Website: www.voc.org.vn (in Vietnamese and English)

in Muscat
- Competitors: 73 in 7 sports
- Medals Ranked 14th: Gold 0 Silver 4 Bronze 4 Total 8

Asian Beach Games appearances
- 2008; 2010; 2012; 2014; 2016; 2026

Vietnam participated in the 2010 Asian Beach Games in Muscat, Oman on 8–16 December 2010. The Vietnamese team comprises 73 athletes competing in 7 sports: Beach handball, Beach sepaktakraw, Beach soccer, Beach volleyball, Bodybuilding, Marathon swimming, Woodball.

== Competitors ==
Sport	Men	Women	Total
Bodybuilding	5	0	5
Beach Handball	0	10	10
Beach Soccer	10	0	10
Beach Sepaktakraw	0	12	12
Beach Volleyball	2	2	4
Beach Woodball	6	0	6
Marathon swimming	1	1	2
Total	24	25	49

== Medal summary ==
=== Medals table ===
Sport	Gold	Silver	Bronze	Total
Beach handball	0	0	1	1
Beach Sepaktakraw	0	1	1	2
Bodybuilding	0	3	2	5
Total	0	4	4	8

== Medalists ==
Medal	Name	Sport	Event	Date
Silver	Vietnam	Beach Sepaktakraw	Women's Team	11 December
Silver	Nguyen Van Lam	Bodybuilding	Men's -65kg	10 December
Silver	PHAM Van Mach	Bodybuilding	Men's -60kg	10 December
Silver	Nguyen Hai Au	Bodybuilding	Men's -70kg	10 December
Bronze	Nguyen Van Tuan	Bodybuilding	Men's -75kg	11 December
Bronze	Nguyen Truong Giang	Bodybuilding	Men's -65kg	10 December
Bronze	Vietnam	Beach Handball	Women's team	16 December
Bronze	Vietnam	Beach Sepaktakraw	Women's Regu	15 December
