= Juri Ide =

Japanese triathlete (born 1983)

Personal information
- Born: 9 June 1983 (age 43) Setagaya, Tokyo, Japan

Sport
- Sport: Triathlon

Juri Ide (井出 樹里, Ide Juri; born 9 June 1983) is a Japanese triathlete. She competed at the 2008 and 2012 Summer Olympics.
