= Malaysia at the 2010 Asian Beach Games =

- IOC code: MAS
- NOC: Olympic Council of Malaysia
- Website: www.olympic.org.my (in English)

in Muscat
- Competitors: 14
- Medals Ranked 12th: Gold 1 Silver 1 Bronze 0 Total 2

Asian Beach Games appearances
- 2008; 2010; 2012; 2014; 2016

Malaysia competed in the 2010 Asian Beach Games held in Muscat, Oman from 8 to 16 December 2010. It won one gold and one silver medal.

== Medallists ==
Medal	Name	Sport	Event	Date
Gold	Sazali Samad	Bodybuilding	Men's 70 kg	10 December
Silver	Mohd Amirul Shafiq	Sailing	Open laser radial	13 December
