= Megumi Iseda =

Japanese windsurfer

Megumi Iseda (伊勢田 愛, Iseda Megumi, born June 30, 1987) is a Japanese sailor. She placed 20th in the women's RS:X event at the 2016 Summer Olympics.
