= Beach handball at the 2010 Asian Beach Games =

- Venue: Al-Musannah Sports City
- Dates: 9–16 December 2010

Beach handball at the 2010 Asian Beach Games was held from 9 December to 16 December 2010 in Al-Musannah Sports City, Muscat, Oman.

== Medalists ==
Event	Gold	Silver	Bronze
Men	Athletes from Kuwait; Yousuf Madouh; Ali Ashkanani; Saleh Al-Jaimaz; Heef Abdullah; Hamad Al-Anezi; Ahmad Al-Dowaisan; Abdulaziz Balous; Naseer Hasan; Hamad Al-Rashidi; Sameh Al-Hajeri	Pakistan; Nasr Ullah; Tariq Iqbal; Azhar Khan; Muhammad Shahid Pervaiz; Babar Sultan; Muhammad Sohaib; Muhammad Uzair Atif; Naseer Ahmed; Tahir Ali; Asif Ali	Thailand; Tiwanon Aunaudom; Channarong Hunvun; Lapat Chutan; Chumphon Chaiwut; Anek Sombunjit; Jirapong Limli; Bulakorn Kongka; Wanchalerm Natethanon; Phairot Usuwan; Chainarong Srisong
Women	China; Xie Chenchen; Li Tingting; Gong Yan; Shen Ping; Zhao Hui; Yao Yingqi; Zheng Dongdong; Du Jijuan; Zhang Tianjie; Yu Aoni	Thailand; Orrathai Wongnara; Nualjan Supaphan; Vanpen Sila; Duangjai Thaohom; Busarakam Sriruksa; Pattarasiri Thanawat; Punpana Manmai; Preeyanut Bureeruk; Pimpipat Chaiviset; Kanyaratn Boonkhoksi	Vietnam; Phan Thị No; Trương Hồng Ngọc; Huỳnh Thị Kim Mỹ; Châu Ngọc Thùy Dung; Nguyễn Kim Oanh; Hứa Thị Thu Nga; Võ Ngọc Hiếu; Nguyễn Thị Kim Thư; Trương To Lợi; Phạm Thị Thanh Vân

== Medal table ==
Rank	Nation	Gold	Silver	Bronze	Total
1	Athletes from Kuwait (IOC)	1	0	0	1
1	China (CHN)	1	0	0	1
3	Thailand (THA)	0	1	1	2
4	Pakistan (PAK)	0	1	0	1
5	Vietnam (VIE)	0	0	1	1
Totals (5 entries)		2	2	2	6

== Results ==
=== Men ===
==== Preliminary round ====
===== Group A =====
Pos	Team	Pld	W	L	SF	SA	SD	Pts
1	Oman	5	5	0	10	3	+7	10
2	Athletes from Kuwait	5	4	1	9	4	+5	8
3	Qatar	5	3	2	7	5	+2	6
4	Bahrain	5	1	4	4	8	−4	2
5	Chinese Taipei	5	1	4	5	9	−4	2
6	Japan	5	1	4	3	9	−6	2

Source: Official website

Date	Time		Score		Period 1	Period 2	SO
09 Dec	15:00	Chinese Taipei	1–2	Qatar	17–14	16–22	3–7
09 Dec	16:00	Japan	0–2	Oman	8–15	14–25	
09 Dec	18:00	Bahrain	0–2	Athletes from Kuwait	6–13	12–14	
10 Dec	16:00	Oman	2–1	Chinese Taipei	20–22	21–18	7–6
10 Dec	17:00	Athletes from Kuwait	2–1	Japan	14–15	21–2	6–5
10 Dec	18:00	Qatar	2–0	Bahrain	12–10	20–18	
11 Dec	16:00	Oman	2–0	Qatar	15–12	17–16	
11 Dec	17:00	Athletes from Kuwait	2–0	Chinese Taipei	15–11	20–14	
11 Dec	18:00	Japan	0–2	Bahrain	8–16	12–17	
12 Dec	12:00	Chinese Taipei	1–2	Japan	18–13	18–21	6–9
12 Dec	16:00	Oman	2–1	Bahrain	12–14	19–18	8–7
12 Dec	17:00	Qatar	1–2	Athletes from Kuwait	12–9	19–22	2–5
13 Dec	10:00	Bahrain	1–2	Chinese Taipei	16–12	16–17	4–10
13 Dec	16:00	Qatar	2–0	Japan	18–14	19–18	
13 Dec	17:00	Athletes from Kuwait	1–2	Oman	17–18	17–12	4–5

===== Group B =====
Pos	Team	Pld	W	L	SF	SA	SD	Pts
1	Thailand	4	3	1	7	2	+5	6
2	Pakistan	4	3	1	6	2	+4	6
3	Jordan	4	3	1	6	3	+3	6
4	Indonesia	4	1	3	2	6	−4	2
5	Afghanistan	4	0	4	0	8	−8	0

Source: Official website

Date	Time		Score		Period 1	Period 2	SO
09 Dec	10:00	Pakistan	2–0	Indonesia	24–18	24–8	
09 Dec	12:00	Jordan	2–0	Afghanistan	22–8	14–6	
10 Dec	10:00	Thailand	2–0	Indonesia	14–10	14–7	
10 Dec	11:00	Pakistan	2–0	Jordan	19–16	20–18	
11 Dec	15:00	Thailand	2–0	Afghanistan	14–7	16–9	
12 Dec	11:00	Pakistan	2–0	Afghanistan	24–11	23–13	
12 Dec	15:00	Jordan	2–0	Indonesia	17–10	25–21	
13 Dec	12:00	Thailand	1–2	Jordan	14–10	12–18	6–7
14 Dec	16:00	Indonesia	2–0	Afghanistan	17–15	22–10	
14 Dec	17:00	Pakistan	0–2	Thailand	12–15	17–18	

==== Places 5–10 ====
===== Places 9–10 =====
Date	Time		Score		Period 1	Period 2	SO
15 Dec	10:00	Chinese Taipei	2–0	Afghanistan	23–2	23–8	

===== Places 7–8 =====
Date	Time		Score		Period 1	Period 2	SO
15 Dec	11:00	Bahrain	2–0	Indonesia	26–17	21–18	

===== Places 5–6 =====
Date	Time		Score		Period 1	Period 2	SO
15 Dec	12:00	Qatar	2–1	Jordan	10–11	14–13	11–10

==== Final round ====
Semifinals
15 December
Oman	1
Pakistan	2
15 December
Athletes from Kuwait	2
Thailand	0

Gold medal match
16 December
Pakistan	0
Athletes from Kuwait	2
Bronze medal match
16 December
Oman	1
Thailand	2

===== Semifinals =====
Date	Time		Score		Period 1	Period 2	SO
15 Dec	16:00	Oman	1–2	Pakistan	20–18	14–15	6–8
15 Dec	17:00	Athletes from Kuwait	2–0	Thailand	18–14	19–12	

===== Bronze medal match =====
Date	Time		Score		Period 1	Period 2	SO
16 Dec	15:00	Oman	1–2	Thailand	18–8	12–13	4–5

===== Gold medal match =====
Date	Time		Score		Period 1	Period 2	SO
16 Dec	17:00	Pakistan	0–2	Athletes from Kuwait	12–14	14–20	

=== Women ===
Pos	Team	Pld	W	L	SF	SA	SD	Pts
1	China	4	4	0	8	0	+8	8
2	Thailand	4	3	1	6	2	+4	6
3	Vietnam	4	2	2	4	5	−1	4
4	Japan	4	1	3	3	6	−3	2
5	Indonesia	4	0	4	0	8	−8	0

Source: Official website

Date	Time		Score		Period 1	Period 2	SO
09 Dec	11:00	Vietnam	2–0	Indonesia	16–8	11–4	
09 Dec	17:00	China	2–0	Japan	14–6	13–9	
10 Dec	12:00	China	2–0	Vietnam	23–8	15–14	
10 Dec	15:00	Thailand	2–0	Japan	10–1	14–10	
12 Dec	10:00	Thailand	2–0	Indonesia	22–7	22–12	
13 Dec	11:00	China	2–0	Indonesia	21–6	31–11	
13 Dec	15:00	Vietnam	2–1	Japan	15–9	11–13	7–6
15 Dec	15:00	Thailand	2–0	Vietnam	15–9	14–6	
16 Dec	14:00	Japan	2–0	Indonesia	14–11	18–8	
16 Dec	16:00	China	2–0	Thailand	20–13	17–12	
