= Thailand at the 2010 Asian Beach Games =

- IOC code: THA
- NOC: National Olympic Committee of Thailand
- Website: www.olympicthai.or.th/eng (in English and Thai)

in Muscat
- Competitors: 125 in 11 sports
- Medals Ranked 1st: Gold 15 Silver 10 Bronze 11 Total 36

Asian Beach Games appearances
- 2008; 2010; 2012; 2014; 2016; 2026

Thailand competed in the 2010 Asian Beach Games, held in Muscat, Oman from 8–16 December 2010. The National Olympic Committee of Thailand sent 125 athletes (80 men and 45 women) who are competing in 11 sports. Thailand topped the rankings for the first time with 15 gold medals.

== Competitors ==
Sport	Men	Women	Total
Bodybuilding	5	0	5
Beach Handball	10	10	20
Beach Kabaddi	6	6	12
Beach Soccer	10	0	10
Beach Sepaktakraw	12	12	24
Beach Volleyball	4	4	8
Beach Woodball	8	8	16
Jetski	10	0	10
Sailing	10	4	14
Triathlon	2	1	3
Water Ski	3	0	3
Total	80	45	125

== Medal summary ==
=== Medals table ===
Sport	Gold	Silver	Bronze	Total
Beach Woodball	4	2	1	7
Beach Sepaktakraw	4	0	0	4
Sailing	3	2	3	8
Bodybuilding	2	0	3	5
Water Ski	1	2	0	3
Jet Ski	1	1	3	5
Beach Volleyball	0	1	1	2
Beach Handball	0	1	1	2
Beach Kabaddi	0	1	0	1
Total	15	10	12	37

== Medalists ==
Medal	Name	Sport	Event	Date
Gold	Thailand	Beach Sepaktakraw	Men's Regu	16 December
Gold	Thailand	Beach Sepaktakraw	Women's Regu	15 December
Gold	Thailand	Beach Sepaktakraw	Men's Team	11 December
Gold	Thailand	Beach Sepaktakraw	Women's Team	11 December
Gold	Khet Tipsumalai	Beach Woodball	Men's Singles	13 December
Gold	Siripat Karinit	Beach Woodball	Women's Singles	13 December
Gold	Thailand	Beach Woodball	Men's Team	13 December
Gold	Thailand	Beach Woodball	Women's Team	13 December
Silver	Klayut Mongkholsamai	Beach Woodball	Men's Singles	13 December
Silver	Praewpan Chaithong	Beach Woodball	Women's Singles	13 December
Bronze	Siraphop Wannapin	Beach Woodball	Men's Singles	13 December
Gold	Somkhit Sumethowetchakun	Bodybuilding	Men's -65kg	10 December
Gold	Sawaeng Panapoi	Bodybuilding	Men's -80kg	11 December
Bronze	Jiraphan Pongkam	Bodybuilding	Men's -60kg	10 December
Bronze	Somsri Turinthaisong	Bodybuilding	Men's -70kg	10 December
Silver	Thailand	Beach Kabaddi	Women	16 December
Gold	Phairot On-nim	Jet Ski	Runabout Open	15 December
Silver	Kritsada Wuttithosaporn	Jet Ski	Runabout Endurance Open	16 December
Bronze	Chok-uthit Molee	Jet Ski	Runabout Open	15 December
Bronze	Thanpun Phangchunan	Jet Ski	Runabout 800cc Superstock	14 December
Bronze	Arthit Wongpinta	Jet Ski	Ski Open	14 December
Gold	Bunyalo Jumruang	Water Ski	Men's Individual WakeBoarding	15 December
Silver	Padiwat Jaemjan	Water Ski	Men's Individual WakeBoarding	15 December
Silver	Thailand	Water Ski	Wakeboarding Team Overall	15 December
Silver	Thailand	Beach Handball	Women	15 December
Bronze	Thailand	Beach Handball	Men	16 December
Silver	Thailand	Beach Volleyball	Women	16 December
Bronze	Thailand	Beach Volleyball	Women	16 December
Gold	Thailand	Sailing	Women's Techno	13 December
Gold	Thailand	Sailing	16 Open Hobie	16 December
Gold	Thailand	Sailing	Radial Open Laser	16 December
Silver	Thailand	Sailing	Women's RSX	13 December
Silver	Thailand	Sailing	Men's Techno	13 December
Bronze	Thailand	Sailing	Men's RSX	13 December
Bronze	Thailand	Sailing	Women's RSX	13 December
Bronze	Thailand	Sailing	16 Open Hobie	13 December
