= Hong Kong at the 2010 Asian Beach Games =

- IOC code: HKG
- NOC: Sports Federation and Olympic Committee of Hong Kong, China

in Muscat
- Medals Ranked 19th: Gold 0 Silver 1 Bronze 3 Total 4

Asian Beach Games appearances
- 2008; 2010; 2012; 2014; 2016; 2026

Hong Kong competed at the 2010 Asian Beach Games held in Muscat, Oman from 8 to 16 December 2010. Hong Kong sent a delegation of 13 athletes to compete in six sports, and finished with one silver medal, and three bronze medals.

== Medalists ==
Medal	Name	Sport	Event	Date
Silver	Tong Yui Shing; Tong Kit Fong	Sailing	Hobie 16	December 13
Bronze	Ling Tin Yu	Open water swimming	Men's 10km	December 9
Bronze	Natasha Tang	Open water swimming	Women's 5km	December 9
Bronze	Natasha Tang	Open water swimming	Women's 10km	December 11

Medals by sport
Sport	1st place, gold medalist(s)	2nd place, silver medalist(s)	3rd place, bronze medalist(s)	Total
Open water swimming	0	0	3	3
Sailing	0	1	0	1
Total	0	1	3	4

== Open water swimming ==
- Ling Tin Yu, Men's 5 km (4th)
- David Wong, Men's 5 km (9th)
- Ling Tin Yu, Men's 10 km (3rd)
- Natasha Tang, Women's 5 km (3rd)
- Natasha Tang, Women's 10 km (3rd)

== Sailing ==
- Lee Chun Ting, Men's techno 293 (7th)
- Man Ka Kei, Women's techno 293 (6th)
- Tong Yui Shing, Tong Kit Fong, Hobie 16 (2nd)
