= Sri Lanka at the 2010 Asian Beach Games =

- IOC code: SRI
- NOC: National Olympic Committee of Sri Lanka

in Muscat
- Competitors: 20 in 4 sports
- Flag bearer: Mahesh Perera
- Medals: Gold 0 Silver 0 Bronze 0 Total 0

Asian Beach Games appearances
- 2008; 2010; 2012; 2014; 2016; 2026

Sri Lanka participated in the 2nd Asian Beach Games in Muscat, Oman.

== Marathon swimming ==
Sri Lanka sent eight swimmers.

Men

- Kanishka Fernando - 10 km
- Sahan Rupasinghe - 10 km
- Pasindu Porawa Gamage - 5 km
- Tharanga Weerakkody - 5 km

Women

- Kaveesha Paththini Wasam - 10 km
- Methma Wismini -10 km
- Sunethra Wijeratna - 5 km
- Dilanka Kankani -5 km

== Sailing ==
Sri Lanka sent two male sailors.

Men

- Roshil Weerathunga - Radial Open Laser
- Krishan Welangagoda - Radial Open Laser

== Beach Kabaddi ==
Sri Lanka sent both a men's and women's beach kabaddi team.

Men

- Buddhika Charith Abeysinghe
- Nuwan Bandara
- Poshitha Chanaka
- Gayan Don Pasquwelge
- Indika Ranasinghage
- Harsha Sandaruwan

Women

The women's team withdrew due to a lack of funds.

- Shirani Anandage
- Nimashi Edirisingha
- Premawathi Kawisi Vidanalage
- Manoja Maddumage
- Malkanthi Sinnasamige
- Dileepa Chathurangi Subasinha Arachchige

== Beach Volleyball ==
Sri Lanka sent two men's and women's beach volleyball pairs.

Men

- Mahesh Perera & Wasantha Ratnapala
- Asanka Pradeep & Navin Peiris

Women

Both women's pairs withdrew.

- Sujeewa Withanange & Nirosha Gunasinghe
- Geethika Gunawardana & Leena Pathakada
