= Al-Musannah Sports City =

Hotel and sports venue in Al-Musannah, Oman

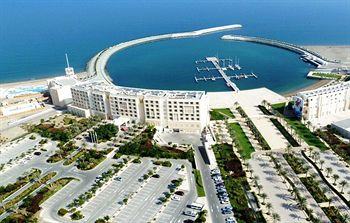
- Interactive map of Al-Musannah Sports City
- Location: Al-Musannah, Oman
- Coordinates: 23.805165°N 57.568788°E
- Owner: Government of Oman
- Capacity: 5,000 athletes
- Surface: Soil
- Scoreboard: Yes
- Acreage: 1,000,000 m^{2} (11,000,000 sq ft)

Construction
- Built: 2008–2010 (900 Days)
- Opened: 8 December 2010
- Cost: 70 million Omani Rial (estimated)

Tenants
- 2010 Asian Beach Games; Government of Oman (2011–present)

Al-Musannah Sports City, also known as Millennium Resort Mussanah, is a large hotel belonging to Millennium & Copthorne Hotels, in Al-Musannah, Oman. The 2010 Asian Beach Games were held there.
