= India at the 2010 Asian Beach Games =

- IOC code: IND
- NOC: Indian Olympic Association

in Muscat
- Competitors: 102 in 10 sports
- Medals Ranked 6th: Gold 3 Silver 0 Bronze 1 Total 4

Asian Beach Games appearances
- 2008; 2010; 2012; 2014; 2016

India participated in the 2010 Asian Beach Games in Muscat, Oman from 8 to 16 December 2010.

== Medalists ==
Medal	Name	Sport	Event	Date
Gold	Hc. Jaswinder Singh	Tent pegging	Individual Sword	10 December
Gold	India	Beach kabaddi	Women	16 December
Gold	India	Beach kabaddi	Men	16 December
Bronze	Insp. Jaswinder Singh	Tent pegging	Rings & Pegs	9 December
