= Philippines at the 2010 Asian Beach Games =

- IOC code: PHI
- NOC: Philippine Olympic Committee
- Website: www.olympic.ph (in English)

in Muscat
- Medals Ranked 0th: Gold 0 Silver 0 Bronze 0 Total 0

Asian Beach Games appearances
- 2008; 2010; 2012; 2014; 2016

Philippines competed in the 2010 Asian Beach Games, held in Muscat, Oman from December 8 to December 16, 2010. The Philippine contingent went home without a medal during the second edition of the Asian Beach Games.
