= Beach volleyball at the 2008 Asian Beach Games =

Beach volleyball competition

- Venue: Sanur Beach
- Dates: 18–25 October 2008

Beach volleyball at the 2008 Asian Beach Games was held from 18 to 25 October 2008 in Bali, Indonesia.

== Medalists ==
Event	Gold	Silver	Bronze
Men	Indonesia; Andy Ardiyansah; Koko Prasetyo Darkuncoro	Kazakhstan; Alexandr Dyachenko; Alexey Kulinich	Kazakhstan; Alexey Sidorenko; Dmitriy Yakovlev
Women	Thailand; Usa Tenpaksee; Jarunee Sannok	Thailand; Yupa Phokongploy; Kamoltip Kulna	Kazakhstan; Alexandra Turichsheva; Tatyana Mashkova

== Medal table ==
Rank	Nation	Gold	Silver	Bronze	Total
1	Thailand (THA)	1	1	0	2
2	Indonesia (INA)	1	0	0	1
3	Kazakhstan (KAZ)	0	1	2	3
Totals (3 entries)		2	2	2	6

== Results ==
=== Men ===
==== Preliminaries ====
===== Pool A =====
Pos	Team	Pld	W	L	Pts	SPW	SPL	SPR	SW	SL	SR
1	Dyachenko–Kulinich (KAZ)	3	3	0	6	146	118	1.237	6	1	6.000
2	Zhong–Ma (CHN)	3	2	1	5	117	100	1.170	4	2	2.000
3	Silva–Ekanayaka (SRI)	3	1	2	4	150	163	0.920	3	5	0.600
4	Bhandari–Magar (NEP)	3	0	3	3	113	145	0.779	1	6	0.167

Source: AVC

Date		Score		Set 1	Set 2	Set 3
19 Oct	Dyachenko–Kulinich (KAZ)	2–1	Silva–Ekanayaka (SRI)	21–19	19–21	22–20
19 Oct	Zhong–Ma (CHN)	2–0	Bhandari–Magar (NEP)	21–17	21–12	
20 Oct	Dyachenko–Kulinich (KAZ)	2–0	Bhandari–Magar (NEP)	21–11	21–14	
20 Oct	Zhong–Ma (CHN)	2–0	Silva–Ekanayaka (SRI)	21–12	21–17	
21 Oct	Dyachenko–Kulinich (KAZ)	2–0	Zhong–Ma (CHN)	21–16	21–17	
21 Oct	Bhandari–Magar (NEP)	1–2	Silva–Ekanayaka (SRI)	21–19	23–25	15–17

===== Pool B =====
Pos	Team	Pld	W	L	Pts	SPW	SPL	SPR	SW	SL	SR
1	Yungtin–Sawangrueang (THA)	3	3	0	6	126	69	1.826	6	0	MAX
2	Rathnapala–Sampath (SRI)	3	2	1	5	104	87	1.195	4	2	2.000
3	Abbas–Khan (PAK)	3	1	2	4	95	112	0.848	2	4	0.500
4	Xavier–da Rocha (TLS)	3	0	3	3	69	126	0.548	0	6	0.000

Source: AVC

Date		Score		Set 1	Set 2	Set 3
19 Oct	Yungtin–Sawangrueang (THA)	2–0	Rathnapala–Sampath (SRI)	21–12	21–8	
19 Oct	Abbas–Khan (PAK)	2–0	Xavier–da Rocha (TLS)	21–13	21–15	
20 Oct	Yungtin–Sawangrueang (THA)	2–0	Xavier–da Rocha (TLS)	21–9	21–15	
20 Oct	Abbas–Khan (PAK)	0–2	Rathnapala–Sampath (SRI)	16–21	12–21	
21 Oct	Yungtin–Sawangrueang (THA)	2–0	Abbas–Khan (PAK)	21–12	21–13	
21 Oct	Xavier–da Rocha (TLS)	0–2	Rathnapala–Sampath (SRI)	6–21	11–21	

===== Pool C =====
Pos	Team	Pld	W	L	Pts	SPW	SPL	SPR	SW	SL	SR
1	Ardiyansah–Darkuncoro (INA)	3	3	0	6	126	92	1.370	6	0	MAX
2	Aoki–Hasegawa (JPN)	3	2	1	5	115	110	1.045	4	2	2.000
3	Mahfoudh–Mohammed (YEM)	3	1	2	4	124	131	0.947	2	5	0.400
4	Poothathan–John (IND)	3	0	3	3	107	139	0.770	1	6	0.167

Source: AVC

Date		Score		Set 1	Set 2	Set 3
19 Oct	Ardiyansah–Darkuncoro (INA)	2–0	Poothathan–John (IND)	21–11	21–15	
19 Oct	Aoki–Hasegawa (JPN)	2–0	Mahfoudh–Mohammed (YEM)	21–19	21–15	
20 Oct	Ardiyansah–Darkuncoro (INA)	2–0	Mahfoudh–Mohammed (YEM)	21–19	21–16	
20 Oct	Aoki–Hasegawa (JPN)	2–0	Poothathan–John (IND)	21–15	21–19	
21 Oct	Ardiyansah–Darkuncoro (INA)	2–0	Aoki–Hasegawa (JPN)	21–17	21–14	
21 Oct	Mahfoudh–Mohammed (YEM)	2–1	Poothathan–John (IND)	19–21	21–18	15–8

===== Pool D =====
Pos	Team	Pld	W	L	Pts	SPW	SPL	SPR	SW	SL	SR
1	Sidorenko–Yakovlev (KAZ)	3	3	0	6	126	78	1.615	6	0	MAX
2	Kuo–Tsai (TPE)	3	2	1	5	115	117	0.983	4	3	1.333
3	Mansour–Al-Otaibi (KUW)	3	1	2	4	110	118	0.932	2	4	0.500
4	Htway–Hlaing (MYA)	3	0	3	3	99	137	0.723	1	6	0.167

Source: AVC

Date		Score		Set 1	Set 2	Set 3
18 Oct	Sidorenko–Yakovlev (KAZ)	2–0	Htway–Hlaing (MYA)	21–11	21–12	
18 Oct	Mansour–Al-Otaibi (KUW)	0–2	Kuo–Tsai (TPE)	19–21	14–21	
19 Oct	Sidorenko–Yakovlev (KAZ)	2–0	Kuo–Tsai (TPE)	21–7	21–13	
19 Oct	Mansour–Al-Otaibi (KUW)	2–0	Htway–Hlaing (MYA)	21–17	21–17	
20 Oct	Sidorenko–Yakovlev (KAZ)	2–0	Mansour–Al-Otaibi (KUW)	21–18	21–17	
20 Oct	Kuo–Tsai (TPE)	2–1	Htway–Hlaing (MYA)	21–10	17–21	15–11

===== Pool E =====
Pos	Team	Pld	W	L	Pts	SPW	SPL	SPR	SW	SL	SR
1	Lin–Hsu (TPE)	3	3	0	6	126	79	1.595	6	0	MAX
2	Kaabi–Mohammed (UAE)	3	2	1	5	109	81	1.346	4	2	2.000
3	Abdul Kareem–Adam (MDV)	3	1	2	4	119	139	0.856	2	5	0.400
4	Abdulla–Al-Sheeb (QAT)	3	0	3	3	80	135	0.593	1	6	0.167

Source: AVC

Date		Score		Set 1	Set 2	Set 3
19 Oct	Kaabi–Mohammed (UAE)	0–2	Lin–Hsu (TPE)	12–21	11–21	
19 Oct	Abdul Kareem–Adam (MDV)	2–1	Abdulla–Al-Sheeb (QAT)	14–21	22–20	15–12
20 Oct	Kaabi–Mohammed (UAE)	2–0	Abdulla–Al-Sheeb (QAT)	Walkover		
20 Oct	Abdul Kareem–Adam (MDV)	0–2	Lin–Hsu (TPE)	12–21	17–21	
21 Oct	Kaabi–Mohammed (UAE)	2–0	Abdul Kareem–Adam (MDV)	21–18	23–21	
21 Oct	Abdulla–Al-Sheeb (QAT)	0–2	Lin–Hsu (TPE)	15–21	12–21	

===== Pool F =====
Pos	Team	Pld	W	L	Pts	SPW	SPL	SPR	SW	SL	SR
1	Al-Jabri–Al-Subhi (OMA)	3	3	0	6	126	53	2.377	6	0	MAX
2	Adil–Sajid (MDV)	3	2	1	5	116	118	0.983	4	3	1.333
3	Rahman–Sheikh (BAN)	3	1	2	4	113	114	0.991	3	4	0.750
4	Fernandes–do Carmo (TLS)	3	0	3	3	56	126	0.444	0	6	0.000

Source: AVC

Date		Score		Set 1	Set 2	Set 3
19 Oct	Al-Jabri–Al-Subhi (OMA)	2–0	Fernandes–do Carmo (TLS)	21–3	21–6	
19 Oct	Adil–Sajid (MDV)	2–1	Rahman–Sheikh (BAN)	21–17	15–21	15–12
20 Oct	Al-Jabri–Al-Subhi (OMA)	2–0	Rahman–Sheikh (BAN)	21–9	21–12	
20 Oct	Adil–Sajid (MDV)	2–0	Fernandes–do Carmo (TLS)	21–15	21–11	
21 Oct	Al-Jabri–Al-Subhi (OMA)	2–0	Adil–Sajid (MDV)	21–8	21–15	
21 Oct	Rahman–Sheikh (BAN)	2–0	Fernandes–do Carmo (TLS)	21–12	21–9	

===== Pool G =====
Pos	Team	Pld	W	L	Pts	SPW	SPL	SPR	SW	SL	SR
1	Suratna–Santosa (INA)	3	3	0	6	143	111	1.288	6	1	6.000
2	Verayo–Sasing (PHI)	3	2	1	5	135	103	1.311	5	2	2.500
3	Khan–Shahzad (PAK)	3	1	2	4	105	117	0.897	2	4	0.500
4	Homsombath–Lathmany (LAO)	3	0	3	3	74	126	0.587	0	6	0.000

Source: AVC

Date		Score		Set 1	Set 2	Set 3
18 Oct	Suratna–Santosa (INA)	2–0	Homsombath–Lathmany (LAO)	21–18	21–9	
18 Oct	Verayo–Sasing (PHI)	2–0	Khan–Shahzad (PAK)	21–14	21–16	
19 Oct	Suratna–Santosa (INA)	2–0	Khan–Shahzad (PAK)	21–18	21–15	
19 Oct	Verayo–Sasing (PHI)	2–0	Homsombath–Lathmany (LAO)	21–4	21–10	
20 Oct	Suratna–Santosa (INA)	2–1	Verayo–Sasing (PHI)	19–21	21–13	19–17
20 Oct	Khan–Shahzad (PAK)	2–0	Homsombath–Lathmany (LAO)	21–16	21–17	

===== Pool H =====
Pos	Team	Pld	W	L	Pts	SPW	SPL	SPR	SW	SL	SR
1	Xu–Li (CHN)	3	3	0	6	132	98	1.347	6	1	6.000
2	Som–Chan (CAM)	3	2	1	5	137	104	1.317	5	2	2.500
3	Phongsavath–Moonthavong (LAO)	3	1	2	4	100	117	0.855	2	4	0.500
4	Labide–Espirito (PHI)	3	0	3	3	76	126	0.603	0	6	0.000

Source: AVC

Date		Score		Set 1	Set 2	Set 3
18 Oct	Xu–Li (CHN)	2–0	Labide–Espirito (PHI)	21–11	21–8	
18 Oct	Phongsavath–Moonthavong (LAO)	0–2	Som–Chan (CAM)	15–21	17–21	
19 Oct	Xu–Li (CHN)	2–1	Som–Chan (CAM)	12–21	21–19	15–13
19 Oct	Phongsavath–Moonthavong (LAO)	2–0	Labide–Espirito (PHI)	21–14	21–19	
20 Oct	Xu–Li (CHN)	2–0	Phongsavath–Moonthavong (LAO)	21–12	21–14	
20 Oct	Som–Chan (CAM)	2–0	Labide–Espirito (PHI)	21–14	21–10	

===== Pool I =====
Pos	Team	Pld	W	L	Pts	SPW	SPL	SPR	SW	SL	SR
1	Al-Housni–Al-Shereiqi (OMA)	3	3	0	6	126	80	1.575	6	0	MAX
2	Trần–Nguyễn (VIE)	3	2	1	5	117	95	1.232	4	2	2.000
3	Malik–Ali (QAT)	3	1	2	4	99	107	0.925	2	4	0.500
4	Maw–Latt (MYA)	3	0	3	3	66	126	0.524	0	6	0.000

Source: AVC

Date		Score		Set 1	Set 2	Set 3
18 Oct	Trần–Nguyễn (VIE)	2–0	Maw–Latt (MYA)	21–10	21–10	
18 Oct	Al-Housni–Al-Shereiqi (OMA)	2–0	Malik–Ali (QAT)	21–15	21–9	
19 Oct	Trần–Nguyễn (VIE)	2–0	Malik–Ali (QAT)	21–11	24–22	
19 Oct	Al-Housni–Al-Shereiqi (OMA)	2–0	Maw–Latt (MYA)	21–14	21–12	
21 Oct	Trần–Nguyễn (VIE)	0–2	Al-Housni–Al-Shereiqi (OMA)	15–21	15–21	
21 Oct	Malik–Ali (QAT)	2–0	Maw–Latt (MYA)	21–11	21–9	

===== Pool J =====
Pos	Team	Pld	W	L	Pts	SPW	SPL	SPR	SW	SL	SR
1	Haroona–Qarqoor (BRN)	3	3	0	6	143	117	1.222	6	1	6.000
2	Nguyễn–Nguyễn (VIE)	3	2	1	5	167	162	1.031	5	4	1.250
3	Sangkhachot–Pollueang (THA)	3	1	2	4	125	129	0.969	3	4	0.750
4	San–Phal (CAM)	3	0	3	3	112	139	0.806	1	6	0.167

Source: AVC

Date		Score		Set 1	Set 2	Set 3
18 Oct	Sangkhachot–Pollueang (THA)	0–2	Haroona–Qarqoor (BRN)	14–21	15–21	
18 Oct	Nguyễn–Nguyễn (VIE)	2–1	San–Phal (CAM)	21–17	19–21	15–11
20 Oct	Sangkhachot–Pollueang (THA)	2–0	San–Phal (CAM)	21–15	21–15	
20 Oct	Nguyễn–Nguyễn (VIE)	1–2	Haroona–Qarqoor (BRN)	23–25	21–19	11–15
21 Oct	Sangkhachot–Pollueang (THA)	1–2	Nguyễn–Nguyễn (VIE)	14–21	21–15	19–21
21 Oct	San–Phal (CAM)	0–2	Haroona–Qarqoor (BRN)	17–21	16–21	

===== Fourth-placed teams =====
Pos	Team	Pld	W	L	Pts	SPW	SPL	SPR	SW	SL	SR
1	San–Phal (CAM)	3	0	3	3	112	139	0.806	1	6	0.167
2	Bhandari–Magar (NEP)	3	0	3	3	113	145	0.779	1	6	0.167
3	Poothathan–John (IND)	3	0	3	3	107	139	0.770	1	6	0.167
4	Htway–Hlaing (MYA)	3	0	3	3	99	137	0.723	1	6	0.167
5	Labide–Espirito (PHI)	3	0	3	3	76	126	0.603	0	6	0.000
6	Abdulla–Al-Sheeb (QAT)	3	0	3	3	80	135	0.593	1	6	0.167
7	Homsombath–Lathmany (LAO)	3	0	3	3	74	126	0.587	0	6	0.000
8	Xavier–da Rocha (TLS)	3	0	3	3	69	126	0.548	0	6	0.000
9	Maw–Latt (MYA)	3	0	3	3	66	126	0.524	0	6	0.000
10	Fernandes–do Carmo (TLS)	3	0	3	3	56	126	0.444	0	6	0.000

Source: AVC

==== Rank 33–41 ====
===== Rank 39–41 =====
Rank 39–41; 23 October			Rank 39/40; 24 October
			Maw–Latt (MYA)	4	7
Raju–Reddy (IND)	21	21	Raju–Reddy (IND)	21	21
Fernandes–do Carmo (TLS)	13	12

===== Rank 37–38 =====
Rank 37/38; 23 October
Homsombath–Lathmany (LAO)
Xavier–da Rocha (TLS)	W	O

===== Rank 33–36 =====
Rank 33–36; 23 October
Poothathan–John (IND)	21	21
Abdulla–Al-Sheeb (QAT)	15	15
Htway–Hlaing (MYA)	21	23
Labide–Espirito (PHI)	13	21

Rank 33/34; 24 October
Poothathan–John (IND)	19	21	10
Htway–Hlaing (MYA)	21	15	15
Rank 35/36
Abdulla–Al-Sheeb (QAT)	18	21	15
Labide–Espirito (PHI)	21	18	8

==== Round of 32 ====
Date		Score		Set 1	Set 2	Set 3
22 Oct	Dyachenko–Kulinich (KAZ)	2–0	Bhandari–Magar (NEP)	21–12	21–7	
22 Oct	Kuo–Tsai (TPE)	0–2	Kaabi–Mohammed (UAE)	16–21	14–21	
22 Oct	Al-Housni–Al-Shereiqi (OMA)	2–1	Mansour–Al-Otaibi (KUW)	21–16	17–21	15–7
22 Oct	Abdul Kareem–Adam (MDV)	0–2	Xu–Li (CHN)	15–21	13–21	
22 Oct	Lin–Hsu (TPE)	2–0	Phongsavath–Moonthavong (LAO)	Walkover		
22 Oct	Silva–Ekanayaka (SRI)	0–2	Trần–Nguyễn (VIE)	17–21	12–21	
22 Oct	Som–Chan (CAM)	0–2	Zhong–Ma (CHN)	14–21	15–21	
22 Oct	Malik–Ali (QAT)	0–2	Sidorenko–Yakovlev (KAZ)	11–21	12–21	
22 Oct	Ardiyansah–Darkuncoro (INA)	2–0	Sangkhachot–Pollueang (THA)	21–11	21–19	
22 Oct	Rathnapala–Sampath (SRI)	0–2	Verayo–Sasing (PHI)	15–21	17–21	
22 Oct	Nguyễn–Nguyễn (VIE)	2–0	Abbas–Khan (PAK)	21–15	25–23	
22 Oct	Khan–Shahzad (PAK)	0–2	Al-Jabri–Al-Subhi (OMA)	16–21	8–21	
22 Oct	Suratna–Santosa (INA)	2–0	Rahman–Sheikh (BAN)	21–12	21–17	
22 Oct	Mahfoudh–Mohammed (YEM)	1–2	Haroona–Qarqoor (BRN)	21–17	15–21	11–15
22 Oct	Adil–Sajid (MDV)	0–2	Aoki–Hasegawa (JPN)	10–21	12–21	
22 Oct	San–Phal (CAM)	0–2	Yungtin–Sawangrueang (THA)	16–21	12–21	

==== Rank 17–32 ====
Date		Score		Set 1	Set 2	Set 3
23 Oct	Bhandari–Magar (NEP)	1–2	Kuo–Tsai (TPE)	21–15	18–21	8–15
23 Oct	Mansour–Al-Otaibi (KUW)	2–0	Abdul Kareem–Adam (MDV)	21–14	21–13	
23 Oct	Phongsavath–Moonthavong (LAO)	0–2	Silva–Ekanayaka (SRI)	Walkover		
23 Oct	Som–Chan (CAM)	2–0	Malik–Ali (QAT)	21–16	21–12	
23 Oct	Sangkhachot–Pollueang (THA)	2–0	Rathnapala–Sampath (SRI)	21–13	21–16	
23 Oct	Abbas–Khan (PAK)	0–2	Khan–Shahzad (PAK)	17–21	13–21	
23 Oct	Rahman–Sheikh (BAN)	0–2	Mahfoudh–Mohammed (YEM)	10–21	9–21	
23 Oct	Adil–Sajid (MDV)	0–2	San–Phal (CAM)	13–21	15–21	

===== Rank 25/29 =====
Date		Score		Set 1	Set 2	Set 3
24 Oct	Bhandari–Magar (NEP)	2–0	Abdul Kareem–Adam (MDV)	21–19	21–11	
24 Oct	Phongsavath–Moonthavong (LAO)	0–2	Malik–Ali (QAT)	Walkover		
24 Oct	Rathnapala–Sampath (SRI)	2–0	Abbas–Khan (PAK)	21–16	21–11	
24 Oct	Rahman–Sheikh (BAN)	2–1	Adil–Sajid (MDV)	10–21	21–10	15–11

===== Rank 17/21 =====
Date		Score		Set 1	Set 2	Set 3
24 Oct	Kuo–Tsai (TPE)	1–2	Mansour–Al-Otaibi (KUW)	18–21	21–17	5–15
24 Oct	Silva–Ekanayaka (SRI)	0–2	Som–Chan (CAM)	14–21	14–21	
24 Oct	Sangkhachot–Pollueang (THA)	2–0	Khan–Shahzad (PAK)	21–15	21–12	
24 Oct	Mahfoudh–Mohammed (YEM)	2–0	San–Phal (CAM)	21–13	21–12	

==== Final round ====
Round of 16; 23 October
Dyachenko–Kulinich (KAZ)	21	21	15
Kaabi–Mohammed (UAE)	23	12	6
Al-Housni–Al-Shereiqi (OMA)	17	16
Xu–Li (CHN)	21	21
Lin–Hsu (TPE)	21	23
Trần–Nguyễn (VIE)	13	21
Zhong–Ma (CHN)	16	26	9
Sidorenko–Yakovlev (KAZ)	21	24	15
Ardiyansah–Darkuncoro (INA)	21	21
Verayo–Sasing (PHI)	16	15
Nguyễn–Nguyễn (VIE)	22	19	10
Al-Jabri–Al-Subhi (OMA)	20	21	15
Suratna–Santosa (INA)	23	21
Haroona–Qarqoor (BRN)	21	13
Aoki–Hasegawa (JPN)	21	21
Yungtin–Sawangrueang (THA)	18	17

Round of 8; 24 October
Dyachenko–Kulinich (KAZ)	21	21
Xu–Li (CHN)	14	12
Lin–Hsu (TPE)	10	15
Sidorenko–Yakovlev (KAZ)	21	21
Ardiyansah–Darkuncoro (INA)	18	21	15
Al-Jabri–Al-Subhi (OMA)	21	11	9
Suratna–Santosa (INA)	21	23
Aoki–Hasegawa (JPN)	18	21

Semifinals; 25 October
Dyachenko–Kulinich (KAZ)	23	21
Sidorenko–Yakovlev (KAZ)	21	19
Ardiyansah–Darkuncoro (INA)	21	21
Suratna–Santosa (INA)	16	18

Final; 26 October
Dyachenko–Kulinich (KAZ)	18	21	14
Ardiyansah–Darkuncoro (INA)	21	19	16
Game for 3rd place
Sidorenko–Yakovlev (KAZ)	23	17	15
Suratna–Santosa (INA)	21	21	8

===== Rank 9/13 =====
Date		Score		Set 1	Set 2	Set 3
24 Oct	Kaabi–Mohammed (UAE)	1–2	Al-Housni–Al-Shereiqi (OMA)	21–17	19–21	8–15
24 Oct	Trần–Nguyễn (VIE)	1–2	Zhong–Ma (CHN)	21–17	19–21	10–15
24 Oct	Verayo–Sasing (PHI)	2–1	Nguyễn–Nguyễn (VIE)	19–21	21–15	15–13
24 Oct	Haroona–Qarqoor (BRN)	1–2	Yungtin–Sawangrueang (THA)	12–21	21–19	13–15

===== Rank 5/7 =====
Date		Score		Set 1	Set 2	Set 3
25 Oct	Xu–Li (CHN)	2–0	Lin–Hsu (TPE)	21–18	21–19	
25 Oct	Al-Jabri–Al-Subhi (OMA)	2–1	Aoki–Hasegawa (JPN)	21–19	16–21	15–12

=== Women ===
==== Preliminaries ====
===== Pool A =====
Pos	Team	Pld	W	L	Pts	SPW	SPL	SPR	SW	SL	SR
1	Tenpaksee–Sannok (THA)	3	3	0	6	126	56	2.250	6	0	MAX
2	Kong–Tse (HKG)	3	1	2	4	94	109	0.862	2	4	0.500
3	Wu–Chang (TPE)	3	1	2	4	98	135	0.726	2	5	0.400
4	Gunasinghe–Wijesinghe (SRI)	3	1	2	4	112	130	0.862	3	4	0.750

Source: AVC

Date		Score		Set 1	Set 2	Set 3
19 Oct	Tenpaksee–Sannok (THA)	2–0	Gunasinghe–Wijesinghe (SRI)	21–11	21–8	
19 Oct	Kong–Tse (HKG)	2–0	Wu–Chang (TPE)	21–15	21–10	
20 Oct	Tenpaksee–Sannok (THA)	2–0	Wu–Chang (TPE)	21–12	21–9	
20 Oct	Kong–Tse (HKG)	0–2	Gunasinghe–Wijesinghe (SRI)	17–21	19–21	
21 Oct	Tenpaksee–Sannok (THA)	2–0	Kong–Tse (HKG)	21–5	21–11	
21 Oct	Wu–Chang (TPE)	2–1	Gunasinghe–Wijesinghe (SRI)	13–21	21–14	18–16

===== Pool B =====
Pos	Team	Pld	W	L	Pts	SPW	SPL	SPR	SW	SL	SR
1	Phokongploy–Kulna (THA)	3	3	0	6	160	113	1.416	6	2	3.000
2	Kapasiang–Rahayu (INA)	3	2	1	5	133	102	1.304	5	2	2.500
3	Bautista–Brillo (PHI)	3	1	2	4	124	108	1.148	3	4	0.750
4	Al-Zawahreh–Al-Zawahreh (JOR)	3	0	3	3	32	126	0.254	0	6	0.000

Source: AVC

Date		Score		Set 1	Set 2	Set 3
19 Oct	Phokongploy–Kulna (THA)	2–0	Al-Zawahreh–Al-Zawahreh (JOR)	21–9	21–6	
19 Oct	Kapasiang–Rahayu (INA)	2–0	Bautista–Brillo (PHI)	21–17	21–16	
20 Oct	Phokongploy–Kulna (THA)	2–1	Bautista–Brillo (PHI)	22–24	21–14	15–11
20 Oct	Kapasiang–Rahayu (INA)	2–0	Al-Zawahreh–Al-Zawahreh (JOR)	21–5	21–4	
21 Oct	Phokongploy–Kulna (THA)	2–1	Kapasiang–Rahayu (INA)	21–10	23–25	16–14
21 Oct	Bautista–Brillo (PHI)	2–0	Al-Zawahreh–Al-Zawahreh (JOR)	21–4	21–4	

===== Pool C =====
Pos	Team	Pld	W	L	Pts	SPW	SPL	SPR	SW	SL	SR
1	Turichsheva–Mashkova (KAZ)	3	3	0	6	149	66	2.258	6	1	6.000
2	Kusano–Ozaki (JPN)	3	2	1	5	142	111	1.279	5	2	2.500
3	Kim–Choi (KOR)	3	1	2	4	71	106	0.670	2	4	0.500
4	Araujo–dos Santos (TLS)	3	0	3	3	47	126	0.373	0	6	0.000

Source: AVC

Date		Score		Set 1	Set 2	Set 3
19 Oct	Turichsheva–Mashkova (KAZ)	2–0	Araujo–dos Santos (TLS)	21–3	21–5	
19 Oct	Kusano–Ozaki (JPN)	2–0	Kim–Choi (KOR)	21–15	21–14	
20 Oct	Turichsheva–Mashkova (KAZ)	2–0	Kim–Choi (KOR)	Walkover		
20 Oct	Kusano–Ozaki (JPN)	2–0	Araujo–dos Santos (TLS)	21–7	21–10	
21 Oct	Turichsheva–Mashkova (KAZ)	2–1	Kusano–Ozaki (JPN)	27–29	21–14	17–15
21 Oct	Kim–Choi (KOR)	2–0	Araujo–dos Santos (TLS)	21–11	21–11	

===== Pool D =====
Pos	Team	Pld	W	L	Pts	SPW	SPL	SPR	SW	SL	SR
1	Alenkina–Tsimbalova (KAZ)	3	3	0	6	128	73	1.753	6	0	MAX
2	Phan–Huỳnh (VIE)	3	2	1	5	118	83	1.422	4	2	2.000
3	Carolino–Roces (PHI)	3	1	2	4	103	97	1.062	2	4	0.500
4	Lopes–da Costa (TLS)	3	0	3	3	30	126	0.238	0	6	0.000

Source: AVC

Date		Score		Set 1	Set 2	Set 3
19 Oct	Alenkina–Tsimbalova (KAZ)	2–0	Carolino–Roces (PHI)	21–11	21–11	
19 Oct	Phan–Huỳnh (VIE)	2–0	Lopes–da Costa (TLS)	Walkover		
20 Oct	Alenkina–Tsimbalova (KAZ)	2–0	Lopes–da Costa (TLS)	21–10	21–8	
20 Oct	Phan–Huỳnh (VIE)	2–0	Carolino–Roces (PHI)	21–19	22–20	
21 Oct	Alenkina–Tsimbalova (KAZ)	2–0	Phan–Huỳnh (VIE)	23–21	21–12	
21 Oct	Lopes–da Costa (TLS)	0–2	Carolino–Roces (PHI)	8–21	4–21	

===== Pool E =====
Pos	Team	Pld	W	L	Pts	SPW	SPL	SPR	SW	SL	SR
1	Jin–Jiang (CHN)	3	3	0	6	126	51	2.471	6	0	MAX
2	Beh–Manokharan (MAS)	3	2	1	5	111	77	1.442	4	2	2.000
3	Tsai–Wu (TPE)	3	1	2	4	79	101	0.782	2	4	0.500
4	Abusalem–Abusalem (JOR)	3	0	3	3	39	126	0.310	0	6	0.000

Source: AVC

Date		Score		Set 1	Set 2	Set 3
19 Oct	Beh–Manokharan (MAS)	2–0	Abusalem–Abusalem (JOR)	21–5	21–7	
19 Oct	Jin–Jiang (CHN)	2–0	Tsai–Wu (TPE)	21–9	21–5	
20 Oct	Beh–Manokharan (MAS)	2–0	Tsai–Wu (TPE)	21–11	21–12	
20 Oct	Jin–Jiang (CHN)	2–0	Abusalem–Abusalem (JOR)	21–6	21–4	
21 Oct	Beh–Manokharan (MAS)	0–2	Jin–Jiang (CHN)	12–21	15–21	
21 Oct	Tsai–Wu (TPE)	2–0	Abusalem–Abusalem (JOR)	21–7	21–10	

===== Pool F =====
Pos	Team	Pld	W	L	Pts	SPW	SPL	SPR	SW	SL	SR
1	Li–Hu (CHN)	3	3	0	6	130	58	2.241	6	0	MAX
2	Siam–Rahawarin (INA)	3	2	1	5	119	73	1.630	4	2	2.000
3	Hong–Kim (KOR)	3	1	2	4	68	105	0.648	2	4	0.500
4	Khatun–Akhter (BAN)	3	0	3	3	45	126	0.357	0	6	0.000

Source: AVC

Date		Score		Set 1	Set 2	Set 3
19 Oct	Li–Hu (CHN)	2–0	Hong–Kim (KOR)	21–6	21–9	
19 Oct	Siam–Rahawarin (INA)	2–0	Khatun–Akhter (BAN)	21–7	21–9	
20 Oct	Li–Hu (CHN)	2–0	Khatun–Akhter (BAN)	21–4	21–4	
20 Oct	Siam–Rahawarin (INA)	2–0	Hong–Kim (KOR)	21–5	21–6	
21 Oct	Li–Hu (CHN)	2–0	Siam–Rahawarin (INA)	21–12	25–23	
21 Oct	Khatun–Akhter (BAN)	0–2	Hong–Kim (KOR)	12–21	9–21	

===== Second-placed teams =====
Pos	Team	Pld	W	L	Pts	SPW	SPL	SPR	SW	SL	SR
1	Siam–Rahawarin (INA)	3	2	1	5	119	73	1.630	4	2	2.000
2	Beh–Manokharan (MAS)	3	2	1	5	111	77	1.442	4	2	2.000
3	Phan–Huỳnh (VIE)	3	2	1	5	118	83	1.422	4	2	2.000
4	Kapasiang–Rahayu (INA)	3	2	1	5	133	102	1.304	5	2	2.500
5	Kusano–Ozaki (JPN)	3	2	1	5	142	111	1.279	5	2	2.500
6	Kong–Tse (HKG)	3	1	2	4	94	109	0.862	2	4	0.500

Source: AVC

==== Round of 32 ====
Date		Score		Set 1	Set 2	Set 3
22 Oct	Tsai–Wu (TPE)	0–2	Carolino–Roces (PHI)	15–21	18–21	
22 Oct	Phan–Huỳnh (VIE)	2–0	Gunasinghe–Wijesinghe (SRI)	21–16	21–15	
22 Oct	Lopes–da Costa (TLS)	0–2	Kong–Tse (HKG)	Walkover		
22 Oct	Wu–Chang (TPE)	2–0	Abusalem–Abusalem (JOR)	21–6	21–11	
22 Oct	Khatun–Akhter (BAN)	0–2	Bautista–Brillo (PHI)	11–21	7–21	
22 Oct	Kapasiang–Rahayu (INA)	2–0	Araujo–dos Santos (TLS)	Walkover		
22 Oct	Al-Zawahreh–Al-Zawahreh (JOR)	0–2	Kusano–Ozaki (JPN)	12–21	5–21	
22 Oct	Kim–Choi (KOR)	2–0	Hong–Kim (KOR)	21–8	21–11	

==== Rank 17–24 ====
Date		Score		Set 1	Set 2	Set 3
23 Oct	Tsai–Wu (TPE)	0–2	Gunasinghe–Wijesinghe (SRI)	18–21	17–21	
23 Oct	Dokka–Masapu (IND)	2–0	Abusalem–Abusalem (JOR)	21–14	21–9	
23 Oct	Khatun–Akhter (BAN)	0–2	Kolla–Yenneti (IND)	13–21	12–21	
23 Oct	Al-Zawahreh–Al-Zawahreh (JOR)	0–2	Hong–Kim (KOR)	18–21	15–21	

===== Rank 21/23 =====
Date		Score		Set 1	Set 2	Set 3
24 Oct	Tsai–Wu (TPE)	2–0	Abusalem–Abusalem (JOR)	21–15	21–10	
24 Oct	Khatun–Akhter (BAN)	2–0	Al-Zawahreh–Al-Zawahreh (JOR)	21–7	21–5	

===== Rank 17/19 =====
Date		Score		Set 1	Set 2	Set 3
24 Oct	Gunasinghe–Wijesinghe (SRI)	2–0	Dokka–Masapu (IND)	21–8	21–13	
24 Oct	Kolla–Yenneti (IND)	0–2	Hong–Kim (KOR)	19–21	19–21	

==== Final round ====
Round of 16; 23 October
Tenpaksee–Sannok (THA)	21	21
Carolino–Roces (PHI)	12	9
Phan–Huỳnh (VIE)	13	10
Beh–Manokharan (MAS)	21	21
Jin–Jiang (CHN)	21	21
Kong–Tse (HKG)	13	15
Wu–Chang (TPE)	11	15
Alenkina–Tsimbalova (KAZ)	21	21
Turichsheva–Mashkova (KAZ)	21	21
Bautista–Brillo (PHI)	16	13
Kapasiang–Rahayu (INA)	12	15
Li–Hu (CHN)	21	21
Siam–Rahawarin (INA)	21	16	12
Kusano–Ozaki (JPN)	14	21	15
Kim–Choi (KOR)
Phokongploy–Kulna (THA)	W	O

Round of 8; 24 October
Tenpaksee–Sannok (THA)	21	21
Beh–Manokharan (MAS)	12	17
Jin–Jiang (CHN)	22	19	10
Alenkina–Tsimbalova (KAZ)	20	21	15
Turichsheva–Mashkova (KAZ)	21	25
Li–Hu (CHN)	14	23
Kusano–Ozaki (JPN)	19	17
Phokongploy–Kulna (THA)	21	21

Semifinals; 25 October
Tenpaksee–Sannok (THA)	23	21
Alenkina–Tsimbalova (KAZ)	21	15
Turichsheva–Mashkova (KAZ)	21	13	5
Phokongploy–Kulna (THA)	16	21	15

Final; 26 October
Tenpaksee–Sannok (THA)	32	21	15
Phokongploy–Kulna (THA)	34	13	12
Game for 3rd place
Alenkina–Tsimbalova (KAZ)	20	21	8
Turichsheva–Mashkova (KAZ)	22	19	15

===== Rank 9/13 =====
Date		Score		Set 1	Set 2	Set 3
24 Oct	Carolino–Roces (PHI)	0–2	Phan–Huỳnh (VIE)	13–21	13–21	
24 Oct	Kong–Tse (HKG)	2–0	Wu–Chang (TPE)	21–19	21–18	
24 Oct	Bautista–Brillo (PHI)	1–2	Kapasiang–Rahayu (INA)	21–17	19–21	11–15
24 Oct	Siam–Rahawarin (INA)	2–0	Kim–Choi (KOR)	21–11	21–11	

===== Rank 5/7 =====
Date		Score		Set 1	Set 2	Set 3
25 Oct	Beh–Manokharan (MAS)	1–2	Jin–Jiang (CHN)	27–25	11–21	8–15
25 Oct	Li–Hu (CHN)	2–0	Kusano–Ozaki (JPN)	21–6	21–19	
