= Triathlon at the 2008 Asian Beach Games =

- Venue: Mertasari Beach
- Dates: 26 October 2008

Triathlon at the 2008 Asian Beach Games was held 26 October 2008 in Bali, Indonesia.

== Medalists ==
Event	Gold	Silver	Bronze
Men's individual	Daniel Lee; Hong Kong	Junichi Yamamoto; Japan	Andrew Wright; Hong Kong
Women's individual	Zhang Yi; China	Xing Lin; China	Jang Yun-jung; South Korea

== Medal table ==
Rank	Nation	Gold	Silver	Bronze	Total
1	China (CHN)	1	1	0	2
2	Hong Kong (HKG)	1	0	1	2
3	Japan (JPN)	0	1	0	1
4	South Korea (KOR)	0	0	1	1
Totals (4 entries)		2	2	2	6

== Results ==
=== Men's individual ===
26 October

Rank	Athlete	Time
1st place, gold medalist(s)	Daniel Lee (HKG)	1:52:49.56
2nd place, silver medalist(s)	Junichi Yamamoto (JPN)	1:53:15.25
3rd place, bronze medalist(s)	Andrew Wright (HKG)	1:54:19.08
4	Lee Chang-yon (KOR)	1:56:00.79
5	Sun Liwei (CHN)	1:56:17.33
6	Kim Ju-seok (KOR)	1:56:56.66
7	Pavel Rastrigin (UZB)	1:58:00.83
8	Wei Chen-chan (TPE)	1:58:10.67
9	Dmitriy Smurov (KAZ)	1:58:36.57
10	Roman Nikitenko (KAZ)	1:59:08.42
11	Youssef Al-Shebi (SYR)	1:59:09.64
12	Mok Ying Ren (SIN)	1:59:24.57
13	Evgeniy Alekseev (UZB)	2:00:44.06
14	Wang Daqing (CHN)	2:02:19.39
15	Jauhari Johan (INA)	2:02:22.30
16	Hsein Shen-yen (TPE)	2:03:51.62
17	Daiki Masuda (JPN)	2:05:45.15
18	Neil Catiil (PHI)	2:05:51.67
19	Andi Edinata (INA)	2:05:56.64
20	Shahrom Abdullah (MAS)	2:06:37.15
21	Mohammad Al-Sabbagh (SYR)	2:09:12.09
22	Chan Wai Yong (MAS)	2:10:05.57
23	Panupong Rungmitjaratsaeng (THA)	2:10:34.37
24	Chong Chi Seak (MAC)	2:11:26.71
25	Thaworn Wongkhan (THA)	2:12:02.05
26	Ahmed Al-Falahi (OMA)	2:16:34.37
27	Sulaiyam Al-Alawi (OMA)	2:18:07.32
28	Joaquim Kok (MAC)	2:25:10.90
29	Firas Al-Hmood (JOR)	2:30:08.76
30	Noojiin Orgil (MGL)	2:30:52.06
31	Raslan Al-Ahmad (JOR)	2:35:00.14
—	Nasanbatyn Naranbat (MGL)	DNS

=== Women's individual ===
26 October

Rank	Athlete	Time
1st place, gold medalist(s)	Zhang Yi (CHN)	2:07:25.58
2nd place, silver medalist(s)	Xing Lin (CHN)	2:07:25:60
3rd place, bronze medalist(s)	Jang Yun-jung (KOR)	2:08:52.80
4	Hong Dan-bi (KOR)	2:09:59.83
5	Miu Hiraide (JPN)	2:11:27.52
6	Naomi Imaizumi (JPN)	2:14:52.78
7	Hoi Long (MAC)	2:15:13.88
8	Lea Langit (PHI)	2:17:21.33
9	Dinah Chan (SIN)	2:19:42.71
10	Wang Yi-wen (TPE)	2:20:46.16
11	Pooja Chaurushi (IND)	2:32:57.67
12	Haya Ghul (JOR)	2:38:10.82
13	Mattika Maneekaew (THA)	2:47:21.45
14	Irene Chong (MAS)	2:52:53.70
—	Mak So Ning (HKG)	DNF
