= Triathlon at the 2006 Asian Games – Women's individual =

Women's individual at the 2006 Asian Games
- Venue: Corniche Triathlon Course
- Date: 8 December 2006
- Competitors: 15 from 10 nations

Medalists
gold medal	Wang Hongni	China
silver medal	Ai Ueda	Japan
bronze medal	Akiko Sekine	Japan

The women's triathlon was part of the Triathlon at the 2006 Asian Games program, was held in Corniche Triathlon Course on December 8, 2006.

The race was held over the "international distance" and consisted of 1,500 metres (0.93 mi) swimming, 40 kilometres (25 mi) road bicycle racing, and 10 kilometres (6.2 mi) road running.

== Schedule ==
All times are Arabia Standard Time (UTC+03:00)

Date	Time	Event
Friday, 8 December 2006	10:00	Final

== Results ==
Rank	Athlete	Swim 1.5 km	Transition 1 + Bike 40 km	Transition 2 + Run 10 km	Total time
1st place, gold medalist(s)	Wang Hongni (CHN)	19:40.00	1:02:29.00	37:35.27	1:59:44.27
2nd place, silver medalist(s)	Ai Ueda (JPN)	20:27.00	1:07:26.00	36:11.81	2:04:04.81
3rd place, bronze medalist(s)	Akiko Sekine (JPN)	20:54.00	1:08:28.00	35:26.42	2:04:48.42
4	Xing Lin (CHN)	19:41.00	1:08:11.00	37:44.77	2:05:36.77
5	Yekaterina Shatnaya (KAZ)	20:51.00	1:08:33.00	37:32.21	2:06:56.21
6	Mak So Ning (HKG)	20:53.00	1:08:31.00	39:59.60	2:09:23.60
7	Yap Fui Li (MAS)	19:39.00	1:08:17.00	42:11.32	2:10:07.32
8	Christine Bailey (HKG)	23:02.00	1:08:57.00	40:06.89	2:12:05.89
9	Nam Na-eun (KOR)	20:52.00	1:08:34.00	42:48.66	2:12:14.66
10	Kim Hye-min (KOR)	23:01.00	1:09:00.00	41:58.69	2:13:59.69
11	Lea Langit (PHI)	20:07.00	1:07:50.00	46:49.69	2:14:46.69
12	Hoi Long (MAC)	21:24.00	1:10:37.00	43:53.96	2:15:54.96
13	Alessandra Araullo (PHI)	23:04.00	1:09:14.00	43:37.19	2:15:55.19
14	Li Shiao-yu (TPE)	25:46.00	1:10:11.00	42:13.62	2:18:10.62
15	Alla Safonova (UZB)	19:43.00	1:12:16.00	49:09.18	2:21:08.18
