= Open water swimming at the 2008 Asian Beach Games =

- Venue: Mertasari Beach
- Dates: 25–26 October 2008

Open water swimming at the 2008 Asian Beach Games was held from 25 October to 26 October 2008 in Bali, Indonesia.

== Medalists ==
=== Men ===
Event	Gold	Silver	Bronze
5 km	Saleh Mohammad; Syria	Xu Wenchao; China	Châu Bá Anh Tư; Vietnam
10 km	Saleh Mohammad; Syria	Li Yinhan; China	Maximillan Manurung; Indonesia

=== Women ===
Event	Gold	Silver	Bronze
5 km	Natasha Tang; Hong Kong	Li Hong; China	Zheng Jing; China
10 km	Li Xue; China	Fang Yanqiao; China	Natasha Tang; Hong Kong

== Medal table ==
Rank	Nation	Gold	Silver	Bronze	Total
1	Syria (SYR)	2	0	0	2
2	China (CHN)	1	4	1	6
3	Hong Kong (HKG)	1	0	1	2
4	Indonesia (INA)	0	0	1	1
4	Vietnam (VIE)	0	0	1	1
Totals (5 entries)		4	4	4	12

== Results ==
=== Men ===
==== 5 km ====
25 October

Rank	Athlete	Time
1st place, gold medalist(s)	Saleh Mohammad (SYR)	1:00:23.6
2nd place, silver medalist(s)	Xu Wenchao (CHN)	1:01:55.1
3rd place, bronze medalist(s)	Châu Bá Anh Tư (VIE)	1:01:57.1
4	Andika Surya Adi (INA)	1:02:55.9
5	Nikita Dacera (PHI)	1:03:40.0
6	Ling Tin Yu (HKG)	1:03:40.4
7	Raymund Haryanto (INA)	1:04:32.7
8	Cheung Siu Hang (HKG)	1:06:10.2
9	Marzouq Al-Salem (KUW)	1:06:10.3
10	Fouad Bakri (SYR)	1:06:26.9
11	Abdulrahman Issa (QAT)	1:06:47.3
12	Musallam Al-Khadhuri (OMA)	1:06:51.4
13	Mohammed Al-Habsi (OMA)	1:07:09.7
14	Kiefer Ticao (PHI)	1:11:04.0
15	Abdullah Mohammad (KUW)	1:11:14.0
16	Ashane Harith Fernando (SRI)	1:11:16.7
17	Abdulrahman Al-Ollan (QAT)	1:11:46.4
18	Vivek Shanbhag (IND)	1:13:28.6
19	Sahan Rupasinghe (SRI)	1:13:48.2
20	Nabih Masri (JOR)	1:18:32.0
21	Kareem Ennab (JOR)	1:18:32.3
—	Ihab Nemr (PLE)	DNF
—	Li Yanhan (CHN)	DSQ
—	Walid Nasib Al-Kaabi (UAE)	DNS
—	Obaid Al-Jasmi (UAE)	DNS

==== 10 km ====
26 October

Rank	Athlete	Time
1st place, gold medalist(s)	Saleh Mohammad (SYR)	2:03:58.1
2nd place, silver medalist(s)	Li Yinhan (CHN)	2:06:35.8
3rd place, bronze medalist(s)	Maximillan Manurung (INA)	2:10:52.7
4	Guruh Kurniawan (INA)	2:11:23.4
5	Ling Tin Yu (HKG)	2:13:00.8
6	Trần Đức Huy (VIE)	2:13:01.5
7	Xu Wenchao (CHN)	2:13:37.3
8	Nikita Dacera (PHI)	2:17:08.5
9	Cheung Siu Hang (HKG)	2:17:16.0
10	Aiman Al-Qasimi (OMA)	2:20:05.0
11	Khalid Al-Kulaibi (OMA)	2:24:41.9
12	Hussain Al-Hassan (SYR)	2:24:43.6
13	Abdulaziz Al-Marzooqi (QAT)	2:28:09.6
14	Abbas Qali (KUW)	2:37:37.6
15	Pasindu Porawa (SRI)	2:42:00.2
—	Mandar Divase (IND)	DSQ
—	Kiefer Ticao (PHI)	DSQ

=== Women ===
==== 5 km ====
25 October

Rank	Athlete	Time
1st place, gold medalist(s)	Natasha Tang (HKG)	1:05:29.1
2nd place, silver medalist(s)	Li Hong (CHN)	1:05:30.4
3rd place, bronze medalist(s)	Zheng Jing (CHN)	1:05:31.3
4	Võ Thị Thanh Vy (VIE)	1:05:50.9
5	Magnolia Kwong (HKG)	1:09:44.2
6	Janice Andayani (INA)	1:10:48.2
7	Niken Christiani (INA)	1:11:20.3
8	Sara Hayajna (JOR)	1:14:13.5
9	Miriam Hatamleh (JOR)	1:14:21.9
10	Han Song-hui (PRK)	1:15:42.2
11	Aditi Dhumatkar (IND)	1:15:42.8
12	Kim Mi-yong (PRK)	1:19:36.8
13	Walimuni Wijerathne (SRI)	1:20:34.1
14	Marvie Borja (PHI)	1:21:03.2
15	Paula Abigail Vega (PHI)	1:21:44.7
16	Chalani Darshani (SRI)	1:29:59.3

==== 10 km ====
26 October

Rank	Athlete	Time
1st place, gold medalist(s)	Li Xue (CHN)	2:09:21.1
2nd place, silver medalist(s)	Fang Yanqiao (CHN)	2:09:21.9
3rd place, bronze medalist(s)	Natasha Tang (HKG)	2:12:49.7
4	Nguyễn Thị Kim Oanh (VIE)	2:22:33.9
5	Cheng Wing Yue (HKG)	2:26:47.8
6	Yessy Yosaputra (INA)	2:31:35.3
7	Arati Ghorpade (IND)	2:38:44.4
8	Inggrit Defanny (INA)	2:38:44.5
9	Han Song-hui (PRK)	2:43:55.3
—	Paula Abigail Vega (PHI)	DNF
—	Marvie Borja (PHI)	DNF
—	Lakmali Adikaram (SRI)	DNF
