= Triathlon at the 2006 Asian Games – Men's individual =

Men's individual at the 2006 Asian Games
- Venue: Corniche Triathlon Course
- Date: 8 December 2006
- Competitors: 28 from 15 nations

Medalists
gold medal	Dmitriy Gaag	Kazakhstan
silver medal	Daniel Lee	Hong Kong
bronze medal	Danil Sapunov	Kazakhstan

The men's triathlon, part of the Triathlon at the 2006 Asian Games, was held in Corniche Triathlon Course on December 8, 2006.

The race consisted of 1,500 metres (0.93 mi) swimming, 40 kilometres (25 mi) road bicycle racing, and 10 kilometres (6.2 mi) road running.

== Schedule ==
All times are Arabia Standard Time (UTC+03:00)

Date	Time	Event
Friday, 8 December 2006	13:30	Final

== Results ==
Legend

- DNF — Did not finish

Rank	Athlete	Swim 1.5 km	Transition 1 + Bike 40 km	Transition 2 + Run 10 km	Total time
1st place, gold medalist(s)	Dmitriy Gaag (KAZ)	18:49.00	1:00:27.00	31:37.14	1:50:53.14
2nd place, silver medalist(s)	Daniel Lee (HKG)	18:47.00	1:00:27.00	32:04.99	1:51:18.99
3rd place, bronze medalist(s)	Danil Sapunov (KAZ)	18:46.00	1:00:29.00	32:05.55	1:51:20.55
4	Ryosuke Yamamoto (JPN)	18:48.00	59:21.00	33:31.48	1:51:40.48
5	Hirokatsu Tayama (JPN)	18:08.00	1:01:06.00	32:37.59	1:51:51.59
6	Shin Jin-seop (KOR)	18:51.00	59:18.00	34:53.46	1:53:02.46
7	Andrew Wright (HKG)	18:46.00	1:00:30.00	33:56.31	1:53:12.31
8	Jiang Zhihang (CHN)	18:47.00	59:23.00	35:37.54	1:53:47.54
9	Ivan Morozov (UZB)	18:49.00	1:00:29.00	34:50.92	1:54:08.92
10	Moon Si-eun (KOR)	18:49.00	1:00:28.00	35:01.46	1:54:18.46
11	Kong Jiajie (CHN)	18:15.00	1:01:02.00	36:40.06	1:55:57.06
12	Artem Mikheev (UZB)	18:51.00	1:06:16.00	36:24.12	2:01:31.12
13	Rami Al-Abdullah (SYR)	22:52.00	1:06:31.00	36:00.21	2:05:23.21
14	Arland Macasieb (PHI)	22:47.00	1:06:36.00	36:14.61	2:05:37.61
15	Henrique Da Silva (MAC)	21:14.00	1:08:07.00	37:17.94	2:06:38.94
16	Saikhom Mani Singh (IND)	21:10.00	1:07:00.00	39:15.69	2:07:25.69
17	Wu Chi Chong (MAC)	22:46.00	1:06:38.00	40:16.96	2:09:40.96
18	Anil Kumar (IND)	21:12.00	1:12:23.00	36:43.02	2:10:18.02
19	Emmanuel Quilala (PHI)	20:41.00	1:07:28.00	42:20.70	2:10:29.70
20	Sulaiman Al-Alawi (OMA)	25:17.00	1:08:23.00	37:15.40	2:10:55.40
21	Heidilee Mohammad (MAS)	28:21.00	1:07:12.00	37:47.05	2:13:20.05
22	Sulaiyam Al-Alawi (OMA)	27:20.00	1:09:09.00	38:43.77	2:15:12.77
23	Chan Wai Yong (MAS)	23:59.00	1:07:36.00	44:45.92	2:16:20.92
24	Roy Nasr (LIB)	22:55.00	1:08:42.00	45:26.43	2:17:03.43
25	Mönkhzayaagiin Tsenguun (MGL)	25:30.00	1:11:41.00	49:05.07	2:26:16.07
—	Nasanbatyn Naranbat (MGL)	22:58.00	1:15:48.00		DNF
—	Ahmad Banna (SYR)	19:41.00			DNF
—	Yang Mao-yung (TPE)	21:17.00			DNF
