= Dragon boat at the 2008 Asian Beach Games =

- Venue: Kuta Beach
- Dates: 19–21 October 2008

Dragon boat racing at the 2008 Asian Beach Games was held in Bali, Indonesia from 19 to 21 October 2008.

== Medalists ==
=== Men ===
Event	Gold	Silver	Bronze
250 m	Myanmar; Thu Htwe Kyaw; Zaw Min; Saw Khay Sha; Pha Nu Saw Sata; Zaw Naing; Myint Tayzar Phone; Aung Lwin Soe; Min Min Zaw; Win Htike; Than Aung; Kyaw Thu Aung; Aung Ko Min; Myo Zaw; Zaw Zaw Kyaw; Aung Ko; Kyaw Myo Khaing; Wai Moe; Naing Lin; Shwe Hla Win; Thaung Win; Yan Paing; Lin Tun Kyaw; Zaw Zaw; Kyaw Soe; Naing Naing Zaw; Tun Tun Lin	Indonesia; Buce Zeth Monim; Jaslin; Weri Pebrianto; Gandi; Rahman Aju; Andri Sugiarto; Sven Stuber; Diyono; Ahmad Supriadi; Isdori; Asep Hidayat; Didin Rusdiana; Indra Yulius; Kuat; Asnawir; Eka Octarianus; Nursalam; Japerry Siregar; Vines Kambay; Anwar Tarra; Husni Hatuina; Jhon Matulessy; Ikhwan Randi; Iwan Husin; Abdul Azis; Spens Stuber Mehue; Ajurahman; Hardony	Philippines; Alex Sumagaysay; Perlito Idorot; Ramie Llano; Ruperto Sabijon; Ric Nacional; Suhod Hakim; Cresanto Pabulayan; Junrey Dayumat; Romy John Dionio; Joemar Ocquiana; Diomedes Manalo; Ricky Sardena; Rolando Isidro; Romel Donesa; Salvador Sumagaysay; Joseph Magno; Raymond Morales; Ambrocio Gontinas; Jose Ijalo; Jesus Asok; Usman Anterola; Roland Tan
500 m	Myanmar; Thu Htwe Kyaw; Zaw Min; Saw Khay Sha; Pha Nu Saw Sata; Zaw Naing; Myint Tayzar Phone; Aung Lwin Soe; Min Min Zaw; Win Htike; Than Aung; Kyaw Thu Aung; Aung Ko Min; Myo Zaw; Zaw Zaw Kyaw; Aung Ko; Kyaw Myo Khaing; Wai Moe; Naing Lin; Shwe Hla Win; Thaung Win; Yan Paing; Lin Tun Kyaw; Zaw Zaw; Kyaw Soe; Naing Naing Zaw; Tun Tun Lin	Indonesia; Buce Zeth Monim; Jaslin; Weri Pebrianto; Gandi; Rahman Aju; Andri Sugiarto; Sven Stuber; Diyono; Ahmad Supriadi; Isdori; Asep Hidayat; Didin Rusdiana; Indra Yulius; Kuat; Asnawir; Eka Octarianus; Nursalam; Japerry Siregar; Vines Kambay; Anwar Tarra; Husni Hatuina; Jhon Matulessy; Ikhwan Randi; Iwan Husin; Abdul Azis; Spens Stuber Mehue; Ajurahman; Hardony	Philippines; Alex Sumagaysay; Perlito Idorot; Ramie Llano; Ruperto Sabijon; Ric Nacional; Suhod Hakim; Cresanto Pabulayan; Junrey Dayumat; Romy John Dionio; Joemar Ocquiana; Diomedes Manalo; Ricky Sardena; Rolando Isidro; Romel Donesa; Salvador Sumagaysay; Joseph Magno; Raymond Morales; Ambrocio Gontinas; Jose Ijalo; Jesus Asok; Usman Anterola; Roland Tan
1000 m	Indonesia; Buce Zeth Monim; Jaslin; Weri Pebrianto; Gandi; Rahman Aju; Andri Sugiarto; Sven Stuber; Diyono; Ahmad Supriadi; Isdori; Asep Hidayat; Didin Rusdiana; Indra Yulius; Kuat; Asnawir; Eka Octarianus; Nursalam; Japerry Siregar; Vines Kambay; Anwar Tarra; Husni Hatuina; Jhon Matulessy; Ikhwan Randi; Iwan Husin; Abdul Azis; Spens Stuber Mehue; Ajurahman; Hardony	Myanmar; Thu Htwe Kyaw; Zaw Min; Saw Khay Sha; Pha Nu Saw Sata; Zaw Naing; Myint Tayzar Phone; Aung Lwin Soe; Min Min Zaw; Win Htike; Than Aung; Kyaw Thu Aung; Aung Ko Min; Myo Zaw; Zaw Zaw Kyaw; Aung Ko; Kyaw Myo Khaing; Wai Moe; Naing Lin; Shwe Hla Win; Thaung Win; Yan Paing; Lin Tun Kyaw; Zaw Zaw; Kyaw Soe; Naing Naing Zaw; Tun Tun Lin	Philippines; Alex Sumagaysay; Perlito Idorot; Ramie Llano; Ruperto Sabijon; Ric Nacional; Suhod Hakim; Cresanto Pabulayan; Junrey Dayumat; Romy John Dionio; Joemar Ocquiana; Diomedes Manalo; Ricky Sardena; Rolando Isidro; Romel Donesa; Salvador Sumagaysay; Joseph Magno; Raymond Morales; Ambrocio Gontinas; Jose Ijalo; Jesus Asok; Usman Anterola; Roland Tan

=== Women ===
Event	Gold	Silver	Bronze
250 m	Indonesia; Astri Dwijayanti; Nikmah Diana; Agustina Kabay; Itta Anggraini; Suhartati; Christina Kafolakari; Multi; Hartawan; Royani Rais; Salwiah; Sarce Aronggear; Hasnah; Masripah; Rasima; Yulanda Ester Entong; Suci Rahmayanti; Farida; Minawati; Siti Maryam; Yohana Yoce Yom; Since Lithasova Yom; Sere Pipit; Mintelda Ibo; Nurmila; Kanti Santyawati; Erni Sokoy	China; Chen Shiping; Hong Yanhuan; Huang Yisen; Pan Lanjuan; Liang Gekui; Feng Hexing; Wu Suding; Zhu Xingkui; Wu Ruimei; He Shuzhen; Wu Huancai; Pan Huizhu; Fang Jincai; Zhou Rundi; Pan Meizhu; Chen Lixing; Wu Shunxia; Huang Yinhua; Zhou Yanwang; Tan Yanlan; Liang Xingcai; Xiong Xiaohe; Lin Shubing; Huang Kedi	Thailand; Supatra Pholsil; Tanaporn Panid; Narissara Namsilee; Oranoot Jatee; Phanthiya Khotchaprasoet; Chophaka Khamkansin; Nuengruethai Saengmueang; Jaruwan Chaikan; Sawita Pantha; Pratumrat Nakuy; Ameema Maepar; Sureephorn Krachan; Orapan Muelae; Preeyapat Ngai-sai; Jilawan Metarasit; Woraporn Boonyuhong; Auncharee Khuntathong; Thanyalak Khanthathong; Nilubon Jittarn; Sureerat Krachan
500 m	Indonesia; Astri Dwijayanti; Nikmah Diana; Agustina Kabay; Itta Anggraini; Suhartati; Christina Kafolakari; Multi; Hartawan; Royani Rais; Salwiah; Sarce Aronggear; Hasnah; Masripah; Rasima; Yulanda Ester Entong; Suci Rahmayanti; Farida; Minawati; Siti Maryam; Yohana Yoce Yom; Since Lithasova Yom; Sere Pipit; Mintelda Ibo; Nurmila; Kanti Santyawati; Erni Sokoy	China; Chen Shiping; Hong Yanhuan; Huang Yisen; Pan Lanjuan; Liang Gekui; Feng Hexing; Wu Suding; Zhu Xingkui; Wu Ruimei; He Shuzhen; Wu Huancai; Pan Huizhu; Fang Jincai; Zhou Rundi; Pan Meizhu; Chen Lixing; Wu Shunxia; Huang Yinhua; Zhou Yanwang; Tan Yanlan; Liang Xingcai; Xiong Xiaohe; Lin Shubing; Huang Kedi	Thailand; Supatra Pholsil; Tanaporn Panid; Narissara Namsilee; Oranoot Jatee; Phanthiya Khotchaprasoet; Chophaka Khamkansin; Nuengruethai Saengmueang; Jaruwan Chaikan; Sawita Pantha; Pratumrat Nakuy; Ameema Maepar; Sureephorn Krachan; Orapan Muelae; Preeyapat Ngai-sai; Jilawan Metarasit; Woraporn Boonyuhong; Auncharee Khuntathong; Thanyalak Khanthathong; Nilubon Jittarn; Sureerat Krachan
1000 m	Indonesia; Astri Dwijayanti; Nikmah Diana; Agustina Kabay; Itta Anggraini; Suhartati; Christina Kafolakari; Multi; Hartawan; Royani Rais; Salwiah; Sarce Aronggear; Hasnah; Masripah; Rasima; Yulanda Ester Entong; Suci Rahmayanti; Farida; Minawati; Siti Maryam; Yohana Yoce Yom; Since Lithasova Yom; Sere Pipit; Mintelda Ibo; Nurmila; Kanti Santyawati; Erni Sokoy	China; Chen Shiping; Hong Yanhuan; Huang Yisen; Pan Lanjuan; Liang Gekui; Feng Hexing; Wu Suding; Zhu Xingkui; Wu Ruimei; He Shuzhen; Wu Huancai; Pan Huizhu; Fang Jincai; Zhou Rundi; Pan Meizhu; Chen Lixing; Wu Shunxia; Huang Yinhua; Zhou Yanwang; Tan Yanlan; Liang Xingcai; Xiong Xiaohe; Lin Shubing; Huang Kedi	Macau; Leong Choi Wan; Kuok Lai Ieng; Chan Leii Fong; Kuan Hoi In; Chan Pui Sze; Chang Ka Man; Sandra Bernardes; Choi Teng Fong; Lou Iat Hei; Leong Kam In; Chao Sio Kam; Chan Hoi Man; Ho Iok Sim; Leong Hou Lam; Lei Sio Hong; Sin Kuan Mui; Ip Weng Man; Sofia Ip; Sam I Wa; Chan Iong Mui; Racy Leong; Ung Ka Ian; Rosita Xavier Nascimento; Pun Wai Kun; Lei Weng I Sou Weng I

== Medal table ==
Rank	Nation	Gold	Silver	Bronze	Total
1	Indonesia (INA)	4	2	0	6
2	Myanmar (MYA)	2	1	0	3
3	China (CHN)	0	3	0	3
4	Philippines (PHI)	0	0	3	3
5	Thailand (THA)	0	0	2	2
6	Macau (MAC)	0	0	1	1
Totals (6 entries)		6	6	6	18

== Results ==
=== Men ===
==== 250 m ====
21 October

===== Heats =====
Rank	Team	Time
Heat 1
1	Myanmar	49.78
2	Indonesia	50.59
3	Philippines	53.03
4	Japan	1:15.26
Heat 2
1	Thailand	55.06
2	China	57.23
3	Macau	1:09.19

===== Repechage =====
Rank	Team	Time
1	Indonesia	52.28
2	Philippines	52.87
3	China	1:04.27
4	Macau	1:08.72
5	Japan	1:13.13

===== Finals =====
Rank	Team	Time
Final A
1st place, gold medalist(s)	Myanmar	50.97
2nd place, silver medalist(s)	Indonesia	51.74
3rd place, bronze medalist(s)	Philippines	53.79
4	Thailand	1:20.33
Final B
5	China	1:02.50
6	Macau	1:12.70
7	Japan	1:14.58

==== 500 m ====
20 October

===== Heats =====
Rank	Team	Time
Heat 1
1	Myanmar	2:02.93
2	Philippines	2:09.87
3	Thailand	2:15.05
4	Macau	2:31.22
Heat 2
1	Indonesia	2:17.06
2	Japan	2:30.71
3	China	2:34.90

===== Repechage =====
Rank	Team	Time
1	Philippines	2:00.98
2	Thailand	2:04.09
3	China	2:16.86
4	Macau	2:29.11
5	Japan	2:32.70

===== Finals =====
Rank	Team	Time
Final A
1st place, gold medalist(s)	Myanmar	1:53.23
2nd place, silver medalist(s)	Indonesia	1:59.00
3rd place, bronze medalist(s)	Philippines	2:11.16
4	Thailand	2:14.64
Final B
5	China	2:22.84
6	Macau	2:30.62
7	Japan	2:34.00

==== 1000 m ====
19 October

===== Heats =====
Rank	Team	Time
Heat 1
1	Indonesia	4:01.28
2	China	4:09.80
3	Macau	4:33.73
4	Japan	4:34.03
Heat 2
1	Myanmar	4:36.43
2	Philippines	4:43.67
3	Thailand	4:57.87

===== Repechage =====
Rank	Team	Time
1	Philippines	4:43.14
2	Thailand	4:43.90
3	China	4:47.58
4	Macau	4:57.68
5	Japan	5:01.57

===== Finals =====
Rank	Team	Time
Final A
1st place, gold medalist(s)	Indonesia	4:29.24
2nd place, silver medalist(s)	Myanmar	4:34.29
3rd place, bronze medalist(s)	Philippines	4:42.91
4	Thailand	4:49.60
Final B
5	China	4:54.52
6	Macau	5:04.80
7	Japan	5:09.11

=== Women ===
==== 250 m ====
21 October

Rank	Team	Final 1	Final 2	Total
1st place, gold medalist(s)	Indonesia	1:05.46	1:04.81	2:10:27
2nd place, silver medalist(s)	China	1:05.94	1:09.89	2:15.83
3rd place, bronze medalist(s)	Thailand	1:17.27	1:16.72	2:33.99
4	Macau	1:17.37	1:17.16	2:34.53

==== 500 m ====
20 October

Rank	Team	Final 1	Final 2	Total
1st place, gold medalist(s)	Indonesia	2:24.55	2:25.49	4:50.04
2nd place, silver medalist(s)	China	2:28.13	2:29.78	4:57.91
3rd place, bronze medalist(s)	Thailand	2:32.60	2:33.26	5:05.86
4	Macau	2:32.68	2:34.76	5:07.44

==== 1000 m ====
19 October

Rank	Team	Final 1	Final 2	Total
1st place, gold medalist(s)	Indonesia	4:56.17	5:05.66	10:01.83
2nd place, silver medalist(s)	China	5:00.17	5:05.76	10:05.93
3rd place, bronze medalist(s)	Macau	5:04.01	5:13.23	10:17.24
4	Thailand	5:09.00	5:09.59	10:18.59
