= Hong Kong at the 2008 Asian Beach Games =

- IOC code: HKG
- NOC: Sports Federation and Olympic Committee of Hong Kong, China

in Bali
- Medals Ranked 6th: Gold 3 Silver 3 Bronze 2 Total 8

Asian Beach Games appearances
- 2008; 2010; 2012; 2014; 2016; 2026

Hong Kong competed at the 2008 Asian Beach Games held in Bali, Indonesia from October 18, 2008, to October 26, 2008. Hong Kong finished with 3 gold medals, 3 silver medals, and 2 bronze medals.

A total of 29 athletes represented Hong Kong, competing in seven of the 17 official sports: beach handball, beach volleyball, bodybuilding, marathon swimming, sailing, triathlon, and windsurfing.

== Medalists ==
Medal	Name	Sport	Event	Date
Gold	Natasha Tang	Open water swimming	Women's 5km	October 25
Gold	Cheng Kwok Fai	Sailing	Men's mistral light	October 25
Gold	Daniel Lee	Triathlon	Men's individual	October 26
Silver	Ho Chi Ho	Sailing	Men's RS:X	October 25
Silver	Chan Wai Kei	Sailing	Women's mistral	October 25
Silver	Tong Yui Shing; Patrick Lam	Sailing	Open hobie 16	October 25
Bronze	Natasha Tang	Open water swimming	Women's 10km	October 26
Bronze	Andrew Wright	Triathlon	Men's individual	October 26

Medals by sport
Sport	1st place, gold medalist(s)	2nd place, silver medalist(s)	3rd place, bronze medalist(s)	Total
Open water swimming	1	0	1	2
Sailing	1	3	0	4
Triathlon	1	0	1	2
Total	3	3	2	8

== Beach handball ==
Hong Kong finished 5th in Group F and was eliminated in the group stage.

== Beach volleyball ==
The women's duo of Kong Cheuk Yee and Tse Wing Hung finished 2nd in Pool A in the preliminaries and ultimately placed 9th overall.

== Bodybuilding ==
- Chan Ming Yin, 65kg (9th)
- Victor Wong, 70kg (10th)
- Lam Chak Leung, 75kg (4th)

== Open water swimming ==
- Ling Tin Yu, Men's 5km (5th)
- Cheung Siu Hang, Men's 5km (8th)
- Ling Tin Yu, Men's 10km (5th)
- Cheung Siu Hang, Men's 10km (9th)
- Natasha Tang, Women's 5km (1st)
- Magnolia Kwong, Women's 5km (5th)
- Natasha Tang, Women's 10km (3rd)
- Cheng Wing Yue, Women's 10km (5th)

== Sailing ==
- Cheng Kwok Fai, Men's mistral light (1st)
- Ho Chi Ho, Men's RS:X (2nd)
- Chan King Yin, Men's RS:X (5th)
- Chan Wai Kei, Women's mistral (2nd)
- Hayley Chan, Women's mistral (5th)
- Tong Yui Shing, Patrick Lam, Open Hobie 16 (2nd)

== Triathlon ==
- Daniel Lee, Men's individual (1st)
- Andrew Wright, Men's individual (3rd)
- Mak So Ning, Women's individual (DNF)
