= Triathlon at the 2006 Asian Games =

- Venue: Corniche Triathlon Course
- Dates: 8 December 2006
- Competitors: 43 from 15 nations

Triathlon for both men and women were contested on December 8 at the 2006 Asian Games in Doha, Qatar. Both men and women competed on the Corniche Triathlon Course. This is the first Asian Games for the Triathlon event. The course features a 1,500 meters swim, a 40 kilometers bike ride, and a 10 kilometers run.

== Schedule ==
F	Final

Event↓/Date →	8th Fri
Men's individual	F
Women's individual	F

== Medalists ==
Event	Gold	Silver	Bronze
Men's individual	Dmitriy Gaag; Kazakhstan	Daniel Lee; Hong Kong	Danil Sapunov; Kazakhstan
Women's individual	Wang Hongni; China	Ai Ueda; Japan	Akiko Sekine; Japan

== Medal table ==
Rank	Nation	Gold	Silver	Bronze	Total
1	Kazakhstan (KAZ)	1	0	1	2
2	China (CHN)	1	0	0	1
3	Japan (JPN)	0	1	1	2
4	Hong Kong (HKG)	0	1	0	1
Totals (4 entries)		2	2	2	6

== Participating nations ==
A total of 43 athletes from 15 nations competed in triathlon at the 2006 Asian Games:

- China (4)
- Chinese Taipei (2)
- Hong Kong (4)
- India (2)
- Japan (4)
- Kazakhstan (3)
- Lebanon (1)
- Macau (3)
- Malaysia (3)
- Mongolia (2)
- Oman (2)
- Philippines (4)
- South Korea (4)
- Syria (2)
- Uzbekistan (3)
