= Syria at the 2008 Asian Beach Games =

- IOC code: SYR
- NOC: Syrian Olympic Committee

in Bali
- Medals Ranked 13th: Gold 2 Silver 0 Bronze 0 Total 2

Asian Beach Games appearances
- 2008; 2010; 2012; 2014; 2016; 2026

Syria participated in the 2008 Asian Beach Games held in Bali, Indonesia from October 18, 2008 to October 26, 2008.

== Medals ==
=== Gold ===
Marathon swimming

- Men's 5 km: Saleh Mohammad
- Men's 10 km: Saleh Mohammad

== See also ==
- Syria at the 2006 Asian Games
