= Japan at the 2008 Asian Beach Games =

- IOC code: JPN
- NOC: Japanese Olympic Committee
- Website: https://www.joc.or.jp

in Bali October 18 – October 26
- Competitors: 80 (59 men, 21 women)
- Medals Ranked 5th: Gold 3 Silver 3 Bronze 3 Total 9

Asian Beach Games appearances
- 2008; 2010; 2012; 2014; 2016; 2026

Japan competed at the 2008 Asian Beach Games held in Bali, Indonesia from October 18, 2008, to October 26, 2008. Japan finished with 3 gold medals, 3 silver medals, and 3 bronze medals. The country sent a total of 80 athletes, 59 men and 21 women.

Surfing was Japan's most successful sport; they took home 2 gold, 2 silver and bronze. The Japanese women's national basketball team won a gold medal in beach basketball after beating Thailand in the final round. The triathlon collected one silver medal from Junichi Yamamoto. Beach wrestling collected one bronze medal from Kota Horaguchi.

== Medalists ==
| Medal | Name | Sport | Event | Date |
|---|---|---|---|---|
| Gold | Yuta Morimoto | Surfing | Men's longboard | October 20 |
| Gold | Akiko Kiyonaga | Surfing | Women's shortboard | October 21 |
| Gold | Mai Komeda; Yuko Toyama; Asami Chiku; Aoi Katsura | Beach basketball | Women's tournaments | October 21 |
| Silver | Yuichi Kurogi | Surfing | Men's aerial | October 22 |
| Silver | Shigenori Suzuki; Shuhei Kato; Yuichi Kurogi; Akihiro Makino | Surfing | Men's team | October 23 |
| Silver | Junichi Yamamoto | Triathlon | Men's individual | October 26 |
| Bronze | Shigenori Suzuki | Surfing | Men's shortboard | October 19 |
| Bronze | Shuhei Kato | Surfing | Men's aerial | October 22 |
| Bronze | Kota Horaguchi | Beach wrestling | Men's 65 kg | October 24 |

Medals by sport
| Sport | 1st place, gold medalist(s) | 2nd place, silver medalist(s) | 3rd place, bronze medalist(s) | Total |
| Surfing | 2 | 2 | 2 | 6 |
| Beach basketball | 1 | 0 | 0 | 1 |
| Triathlon | 0 | 1 | 0 | 2 |
| Beach wrestling | 0 | 0 | 1 | 1 |
| Total | 3 | 3 | 3 | 9 |

== Competitors ==
The following is the list of number of competitors participating in the Games.

| Sport | Men | Women | Total |
|---|---|---|---|
| Beach basketball | 4 | 4 | 8 |
| Beach handball | 10 | 9 | 19 |
| Beach volleyball | 2 | 2 | 4 |
| Beach wrestling | 4 | 0 | 4 |
| Bodybuilding | 6 | 0 | 6 |
| Dragon boat | 21 | 0 | 21 |
| Paragliding | 4 | 2 | 6 |
| Surfing | 6 | 2 | 8 |
| Triathlon | 2 | 2 | 4 |
| Total | 59 | 21 | 80 |

== Beach basketball ==
4 men 4 women

== Beach handball ==
10 men 9 women

== Beach volleyball ==
2 men 2 women

== Beach wrestling ==
4 men

== Bodybuilding ==
6 men

== Dragon boat ==
21 men

== Paragliding ==
4 men 2 women

== Surfing ==
6 men 2 women

== Triathlon ==
2 men 2 women
