= Yelistratov =

Yelistratov or Elistratov (Russian: Елистратов) is a Russian masculine surname, its feminine counterpart is Yelistratova or Elistratova. It may refer to:

- Semion Elistratov (born 1990), Russian speed skater
- Yuliya Yelistratova (born 1988), Ukrainian triathlete
