= Beach wrestling at the 2008 Asian Beach Games =

Wrestling competitions

- Venue: Tanjung Benoa
- Dates: 24–25 October 2008

Beach wrestling at the 2008 Asian Beach Games was held in Bali, Indonesia from 24 October to 25 October 2008. The competition included only men's events for four different weight categories.

== Medalists ==
Event	Gold	Silver	Bronze
65 kg	Ghulam Haider; Pakistan	Pahmi Pami Ginawan; Indonesia	Lee Seung-chul; South Korea
65 kg	Ghulam Haider; Pakistan	Pahmi Pami Ginawan; Indonesia	Kota Horaguchi; Japan
75 kg	Lee Yun-seok; South Korea	Muhammad Ali; Pakistan	Rudi Hariyanto; Indonesia
75 kg	Lee Yun-seok; South Korea	Muhammad Ali; Pakistan	Ahmad Mansoor Musleh; Afghanistan
85 kg	Alishah Azimzada; Afghanistan	Noh Je-hyoun; South Korea	Nur Rusli; Indonesia
85 kg	Alishah Azimzada; Afghanistan	Noh Je-hyoun; South Korea	Usman Majeed; Pakistan
+85 kg	Tömörkhüügiin Enkh-Amgalan; Mongolia	Koo Tae-hyun; South Korea	Wanchat Jenpracha; Thailand
+85 kg	Tömörkhüügiin Enkh-Amgalan; Mongolia	Koo Tae-hyun; South Korea	Muhammad Taseen; Pakistan

== Medal table ==
Rank	Nation	Gold	Silver	Bronze	Total
1	South Korea (KOR)	1	2	1	4
2	Pakistan (PAK)	1	1	2	4
3	Afghanistan (AFG)	1	0	1	2
4	Mongolia (MGL)	1	0	0	1
5	Indonesia (INA)	0	1	2	3
6	Japan (JPN)	0	0	1	1
6	Thailand (THA)	0	0	1	1
Totals (7 entries)		4	4	8	16

== Results ==
=== 65 kg ===
24 October

Round of 16
Michael Natividad (PHI)	0
Kota Horaguchi (JPN)	3

Quarterfinals
Lee Seung-chul (KOR)	0
Pahmi Pami Ginawan (INA)	3
Pichaipusit Taprad (THA)	3
Saov Dorn (LAO)	0
Ghulam Haider (PAK)	3
Mohammad Akram Rahimi (AFG)	0
Sultan Muktarov (KGZ)	0
Kota Horaguchi (JPN)	4

Semifinals
Pahmi Pami Ginawan (INA)	3
Pichaipusit Taprad (THA)	0
Ghulam Haider (PAK)	3
Kota Horaguchi (JPN)	0

Final
Pahmi Pami Ginawan (INA)	0
Ghulam Haider (PAK)	3

Fight for 3rd place
Lee Seung-chul (KOR)	3
Pichaipusit Taprad (THA)	1
Mohammad Akram Rahimi (AFG)	0
Kota Horaguchi (JPN)	3

=== 75 kg ===
25 October

Round of 16
Muhammad Ali (PAK)	3
Luis Ansag (PHI)	0

Quarterfinals
Prasan Tongoau (THA)	0
Chab Loeun (CAM)	3
Lee Yun-seok (KOR)	4
Rudi Hariyanto (INA)	0
Tömörbaataryn Odbayar (MGL)	0
Ahmad Mansoor Musleh (AFG)	3
Takahisha Oda (JPN)	0
Muhammad Ali (PAK)	3

Semifinals
Chab Loeun (CAM)	0
Lee Yun-seok (KOR)	3
Ahmad Mansoor Musleh (AFG)	0
Muhammad Ali (PAK)	3

Final
Lee Yun-seok (KOR)	3
Muhammad Ali (PAK)	0

Repechage
Luis Ansag (PHI)	0
Takahisha Oda (JPN)	3

Fight for 3rd place
Rudi Hariyanto (INA)	3
Chab Loeun (CAM)	1
Takahisha Oda (JPN)	0
Ahmad Mansoor Musleh (AFG)	3

=== 85 kg ===
24 October

Round of 16
Jason Balabal (PHI)	3
Sherali Bozorov (TJK)	0
Usman Majeed (PAK)	3
Daniar Kobonov (KGZ)	0

Quarterfinals
Alishah Azimzada (AFG)	3
Nur Rusli (INA)	0
Kreakgkrai Suwannachat (THA)	3
Tulqin Valiev (UZB)	1
Noh Je-hyoun (KOR)	3
Takayuki Mizuguchi (JPN)	0
Jason Balabal (PHI)	1
Usman Majeed (PAK)	3

Semifinals
Alishah Azimzada (AFG)	3
Kreakgkrai Suwannachat (THA)	0
Noh Je-hyoun (KOR)	4
Usman Majeed (PAK)	0

Final
Alishah Azimzada (AFG)	3
Noh Je-hyoun (KOR)	1

Fight for 3rd place
Nur Rusli (INA)	3
Kreakgkrai Suwannachat (THA)	0
Takayuki Mizuguchi (JPN)	0
Usman Majeed (PAK)	3

=== +85 kg ===
25 October

Round of 16
Muhammad Taseen (PAK)	0
Tömörkhüügiin Enkh-Amgalan (MGL)	3

Quarterfinals
Wanchat Jenpracha (THA)	3
Tomoyaso Shimizu (JPN)	0
Koo Tae-hyun (KOR)	3
Agus Sahrul Hanafiah (INA)	0
Janarbek Kenjeev (KGZ)	4
Abdullahbik Baikzada (AFG)	0
Francis Villanueva (PHI)	0
Tömörkhüügiin Enkh-Amgalan (MGL)	3

Semifinals
Wanchat Jenpracha (THA)	0
Koo Tae-hyun (KOR)	3
Janarbek Kenjeev (KGZ)	0
Tömörkhüügiin Enkh-Amgalan (MGL)	3

Final
Koo Tae-hyun (KOR)	0
Tömörkhüügiin Enkh-Amgalan (MGL)	3

Repechage
Muhammad Taseen (PAK)	3
Francis Villanueva (PHI)	0

Fight for 3rd place
Agus Sahrul Hanafiah (INA)	1
Wanchat Jenpracha (THA)	3
Muhammad Taseen (PAK)	3
Janarbek Kenjeev (KGZ)	1
