= Afghanistan at the 2008 Asian Beach Games =

- IOC code: AFG
- NOC: Afghanistan National Olympic Committee

in Bali
- Medals Ranked 18th: Gold 1 Silver 0 Bronze 1 Total 2

Asian Beach Games appearances
- 2008; 2010; 2012; 2014; 2016; 2026

Afghanistan competed at the 2008 Asian Beach Games held in Bali, Indonesia from October 18, 2008, to October 26, 2008. Afghanistan finished with 1 gold medal and 1 bronze medal. Both medals were won in the sport of beach wrestling
