= Wang Hongni =

Chinese triathlete

Medal record

Women's triathlon

Representing China

Asian Games
Gold medal – first place	2006 Doha	Individual

Wang Hongni (Chinese: 王虹霓; pinyin: Wáng Hóngní; born March 9, 1982 in Jinan, Shandong) is a female Chinese triathlete. Wang competed at the second Olympic triathlon at the 2004 Summer Olympics. She took fortieth place with a total time of 2:18:40.07.

She won gold at the 2006 Asian Games in Doha in the triathlon event.
