= Saleh Mohammad (swimmer) =

Syrian swimmer (born 1986)

Personal information
- Full name: Saleh Mohammad
- National team: Syria
- Born: 27 April 1986 (age 40) Damascus, Syria
- Height: 1.70 m (5 ft 7 in)
- Weight: 55 kg (121 lb)

Sport
- Sport: Swimming
- Strokes: Open water
Medal record
Men's swimming
Representing Syria
Asian Beach Games
Gold medal – first place	2008 Bali	5 km open
Gold medal – first place	2008 Bali	10 km open
Gold medal – first place	2010 Muscat	5 km open
Silver medal – second place	2010 Muscat	10 km open

Saleh Mohammad (Arabic: صالح محمد; born April 27, 1986) is a Syrian swimmer, who specialized in open water marathon. He represented his Syria in the inaugural 10 km race at the 2008 Summer Olympics, and has also won a career total of four medals (three golds and one silver) in a major international open water competition, spanning two editions of the Asian Beach Games (2008 and 2010).

Mohammad competed as a lone open water swimmer for Syria in the inaugural men's 10 km marathon at the 2008 Summer Olympics in Beijing. Leading up to the Games, he finished with a twenty-third place time of 1:54:45.5, but managed to pick up the continental spot as Asia's representative at the FINA World Open Water Swimming Championships in Seville, Spain. Farther from the leaders by about ten body lengths, Mohammad nearly pulled from the end of the field to claim the nineteenth spot out of twenty-four entrants in 1:54:37.7, two minutes and forty-six seconds (2:46) behind eventual gold medalist Maarten van der Weijden of the Netherlands.
