= Akiko Sekine =

Japanese triathlete

Personal information
- Born: Akiko Hirao (Hirao Akiko); August 30, 1975 (age 50) Kita-Kyushu, Fukuoka, Japan
Medal record
Women's Triathlon
Representing Japan
Asian Games
| Bronze medal – third place | 2006 Doha | Individual |

Akiko Sekine (関根 明子, Sekine Akiko; née Hirao; born August 30, 1975) is an athlete from Japan, who competes in triathlon. She competed at the first Olympic triathlon at the 2000 Summer Olympics. She took seventeenth place with a total time of 2:04:18.70. She also competed at the second Olympic triathlon at the 2004 Summer Olympics. She took twelfth place with a total time of 2:07:34.02.
