= South Korea at the 2008 Asian Beach Games =

- IOC code: KOR
- NOC: Korean Olympic Committee

in Bali
- Medals Ranked 4th: Gold 4 Silver 7 Bronze 10 Total 21

Asian Beach Games appearances
- 2008; 2010; 2012; 2014; 2016

South Korea competed at the 2008 Asian Beach Games held in Bali, Indonesia from October 18, 2008 to October 26, 2008. South Korea finished with 4 gold medals, 7 silver medals, and 10 bronze medals.

== Medal summary ==
=== Medal table ===
Sport	Gold	Silver	Bronze	Total
Paragliding	1	4	3	8
Beach wrestling	1	2	1	4
Bodybuilding	1	1	2	4
Sailing	1	0	0	1
Beach sepaktakraw	0	0	2	2
Beach kabaddi	0	0	1	1
Triathlon	0	0	1	1
Totals (7 entries)	4	7	10	21

=== Medalists ===
Medal	Name	Sport	Event
Gold	Lee Yun-seok	Beach wrestling	Men's -75 kg
Gold	Lee Jin-ho	Bodybuilding	Men's 85 kg
Gold	Men's Team	Paragliding	Men's Team accuracy
Gold	Lee Tae-hoon	Sailing	Men's RSX
Silver	Noh Je-hyoun	Beach wrestling	Men's -85 kg
Silver	Koo Tae-hyun	Beach wrestling	Men's +85 kg
Silver	Kim Myung-sub	Bodybuilding	Men's 75 kg
Silver	Ha Chi-kyong	Paragliding	Men's Accuracy
Silver	Ha Chi-kyong	Paragliding	Men's Distance
Silver	Men's Team	Paragliding	Men's Team distance
Silver	Park Koung-young	Paragliding	Women's Distance
Bronze	Women's Team	Beach kabaddi	Women's Beach kabaddi
Bronze	Men's Team	Beach sepaktakraw	Men's Beach sepaktakraw
Bronze	Women's Team	Beach sepaktakraw	Women's Beach sepaktakraw
Bronze	Lee Seung-chul	Beach wrestling	Men's -65 kg
Bronze	Kim Jin-sik	Bodybuilding	Men's 65 kg
Bronze	Kim Chong-won	Bodybuilding	Men's 80 kg
Bronze	Kim Jin-oh	Paragliding	Men's Accuracy
Bronze	Women's Team	Paragliding	Women's Team accuracy
Bronze	Women's Team	Paragliding	Women's Team distance
Bronze	Jang Yun-jung	Triathlon	Women's Triathlon
