= Tsai Yin-feng =

Taiwanese volleyball player (born 1984)

Tsai Yin Feng
Personal information
- Nationality: Chinese Taipei
- Born: 6 November 1984 (age 41)
- Height: 181 cm (71 in)
- Weight: 75 kg (165 lb)
- Spike: 291 cm (115 in)
- Block: 280 cm (110 in)

Volleyball information
- Number: 14 (national team)

National team
- Years: Team
- 2012: Chinese Taipei

Tsai Yin Feng (born 6 November 1984) is a Taiwanese female volleyball and beach volleyball player. She was part of the Chinese Taipei women's national volleyball team.

She participated in the 2007 FIVB Volleyball World Grand Prix, and in the 2010 FIVB Volleyball World Grand Prix.
