= Danylo Sapunov =

Kazakh-Ukrainian triathlete

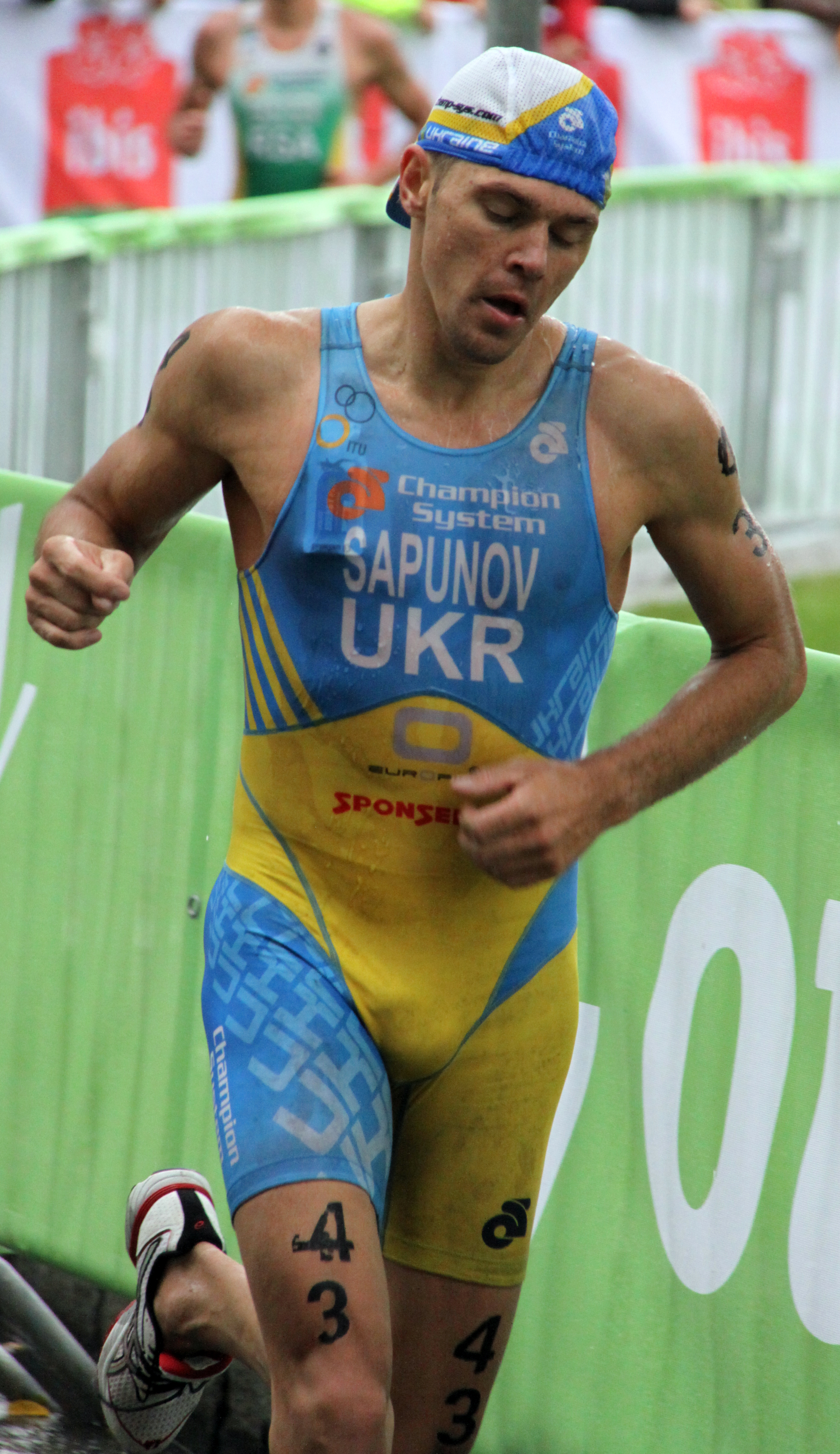
- Sapunov in 2010

Medal record

Men's triathlon

Representing Kazakhstan

Asian Games
Bronze medal – third place	2006 Doha	Individual

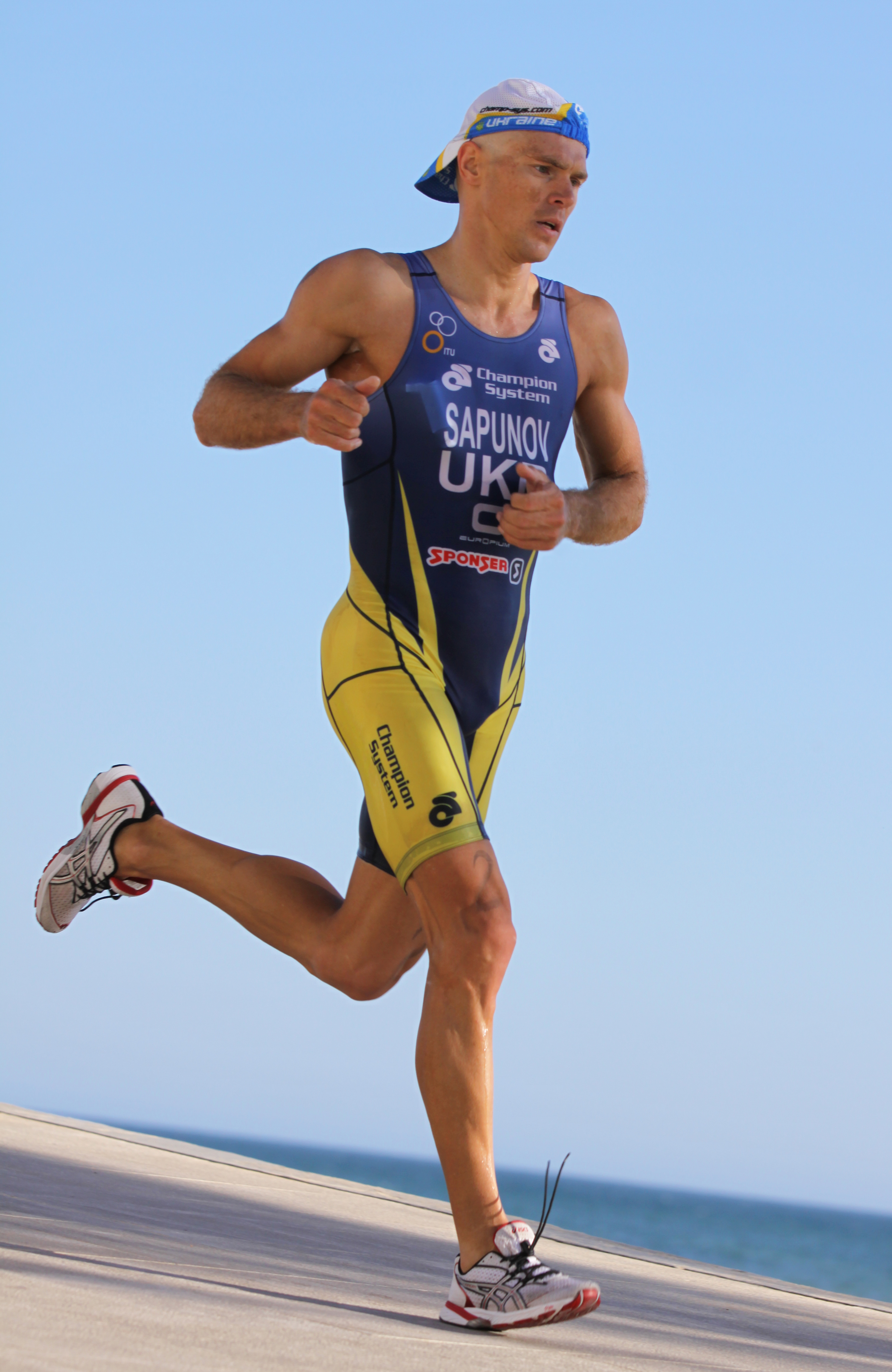
Sapunov at the European Cup triathlon in Quarteira, 2011.

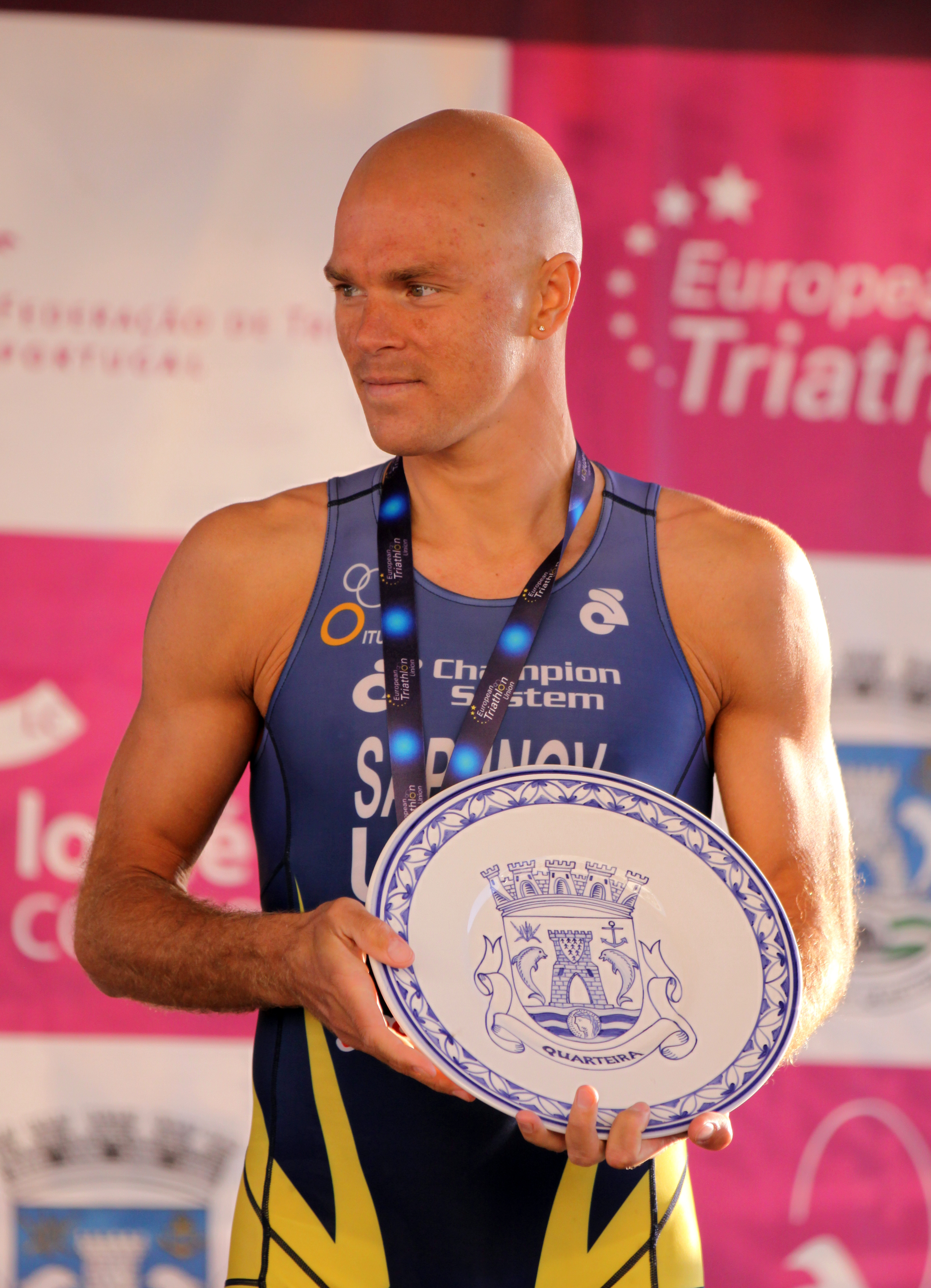
Sapunov with the bronze medal at the European Cup triathlon in Quarteira, 2011.

Danylo Sapunov (Ukrainian: Данило Сапунов, patronymic: Володимирович; born 5 April 1982 in Zaporizhya), is a Kazakhstani (since 2002 till 2009) and Ukrainian (until 2002 and since 2010) professional triathlete. From 2008 to 2010, Danylo Sapunov was married to the Ukrainian triathlete Yuliya Yelistratova.

== Career ==
He is a triple Olympic Games participant (Athens 2004: 17th for Kazakhstan; Beijing 2008: 21st for Kazakhstan; London 2012: 42nd for Ukraine). Sapunov also represented Kazakhstan at the Asian Games.

In the eleven years from 2000 to 2010, Sapunov took part in 95 ITU competitions and achieved 56 top ten positions, among which 13 gold medals. He was the best Ukrainian triathlete in the Men Olympic Ranking London 2012.

== Doping and Disqualification ==
On 10 April, 2020, the IRONMAN® Anti-Doping Program announced that Daniil Sapunov violated anti-doping rules resulting from out-of-competition testing. The athletes have accepted a four-year sanction for the anti-doping rule violation

=== ITU competitions ===
Unless indicated otherwise, the following competitions are triathlons and belong to the Elite category. The list is based upon the official ITU rankings and the athlete's Profile Page.

Date	Competition	Place	Rank
2000-07-08	European Championships (Junior)	Stein	29
2001-06-23	European Championships (Junior)	Carlsbad (Karlovy Vary)	20
2001-08-18	World Cup	Tiszaújváros	25
2002-06-08	European Cup	Belgrade	3
2002-07-28	World Cup	Tiszaújváros	24
2002-09-29	Asian Regional Championships	Murakami City	10
2002-10-06	World Cup	Makuhari	21
2002-10-23	European Cup	Alanya	2
2002-11-09	World Championships (U23)	Cancun	4
2003-06-07	World Cup	Tongyeong	14
2003-06-15	World Cup	Gamagori	10
2003-08-03	World Cup	Tiszaújváros	15
2003-10-13	World Cup	Makuhari	4
2003-10-22	European Cup	Alanya	2
2004-04-03	ASTC Triathlon Asian Championships	Subic Bay	2
2004-04-11	World Cup	Ishigaki	49
2004-04-25	World Cup	Mazatlan	10
2004-05-09	World Championships (U23)	Madeira	4
2004-06-12	World Cup	Tongyeong	18
2004-07-11	Asian Cup	Burabay	2
2004-08-01	World Cup	Tiszaújváros	14
2004-08-25	Olympic Games	Athens	17
2004-09-05	Asian Cup	Macau	3
2004-10-31	World Cup	Cancun	7
2004-11-07	World Cup	Rio de Janeiro	14
2005-07-02	ASTC Triathlon Asian Championships	Singapore	6
2005-09-10	World Championships (U23)	Gamagori	2
2005-09-17	OSIM World Cup	Beijing	19
2005-10-26	Premium European Cup	Alanya	5
2006-03-03	World Cup	Doha	12
2006-04-16	World Cup	Ishigaki	21
2006-05-27	Asian Cup	Yicheng	1
2006-06-03	Asian Cup	Tongyeong	2
2006-06-11	BG World Cup	Richards Bay	6
2006-07-01	Asian Cup	Singapore	2
2006-07-23	Asian Cup	Jinzhou	1
2006-07-30	Asian Cup	Burabay	1
2006-08-12	ASTC Triathlon Asian Championships	Jiayuguan	2
2006-09-02	World Championships	Lausanne	29
2006-09-09	BG World Cup	Hamburg	30
2006-09-17	Asian Cup	Macau	3
2006-09-24	BG World Cup	Beijing	38
2006-10-18	Premium European Cup	Alanya	6
2006-11-05	BG World Cup	Cancun	10
2006-12-08	Asian Games	Doha	3
2007-04-15	BG World Cup	Ishigaki	21
2007-05-12	Asian Cup	Yicheng	6
2007-06-01	ASTC Triathlon Asian Championships	Tongyeong	1
2007-06-17	BG World Cup	Des Moines	7
2007-06-24	Asian Cup	Sokcho City	1
2007-07-15	Asian Cup	Burabay	1
2007-07-22	Asian Cup	Jinzhou	1
2007-08-12	Asian Cup	Jiayuguan	1
2007-08-30	BG World Championships	Hamburg	26
2007-09-15	BG World Cup	Beijing	54
2007-09-23	Asian Cup	Hong Kong	1
2007-10-24	Premium European Cup	Alanya	5
2007-11-04	BG World Cup	Cancun	20
2008-04-13	BG World Cup	Ishigaki	27
2008-04-26	BG World Cup	Tongyeong	15
2008-05-02	ASTC Triathlon Asian Championships	Guanzhou	2
2008-05-25	Asian Cup	Seoul	DNS
2008-06-15	Asian Cup	Seorak	1
2008-06-22	World Cup	Hy-Vee	15
2008-07-06	Asian Cup	Burabay	1
2008-08-03	European Cup	Egirdir	1
2008-08-18	Olympic Games	Beijing	21
2008-09-07	Premium European Cup	Kedzierzyn Kozle	6
2008-09-27	Asian Cup	Suixian	2
2008-10-26	Premium European Cup	Alanya	3
2008-11-15	Asian Cup	Hong Kong	3
2009-05-02	Dextro Energy World Championship Series	Tongyeong	18
2009-06-21	Dextro Energy World Championship Series	Washington DC	21
2009-06-27	Elite Cup	Hy-Vee	9
2009-07-11	Dextro Energy World Championship Series	Kitzbühel	34
2009-07-18	European Cup	Brno	15
2009-07-25	Premium Asian Cup	Beijing	1
2009-08-22	Dextro Energy World Championship Series	Yokohama	12
2009-09-09	Dextro Energy World Championship Series, Grand Final	Gold Coast	40
2009-10-17	Premium Asian Cup	Hong Kong	3
2009-10-25	Premium European Cup	Alanya	7
2009-11-08	World Cup	Huatulco	4
2009-11-21	Premium European Cup	Eilat	4
2010-03-27	World Cup	Mooloolaba	5
2010-04-11	Dextro Energy World Championship Series	Sydney	33
2010-05-15	Premium Asian Cup	Fuzhou	3
2010-06-12	Elite Cup	Hy-Vee	23
2010-07-03	European Championships	Athlone	25
2010-07-10	World Cup	Holten	5
2010-08-29	Premium European Cup	Almere	4
2010-09-08	Dextro Energy World Championship Series, Grand Final	Budapest	45
2010-10-10	World Cup	Huatulco	16
2010-10-16	World Cup	Tongyeong	26
2010-10-23	Asian Cup	Hong Kong	6
2010-09-08	Premium European Cup	Eilat	5
2011-04-03	European Cup	Antalya	20
2011-04-09	European Cup	Quarteira	3
2011-05-08	World Cup	Monterrey	7
2011-05-15	Asian Cup	Seoul	2
2011-06-04	Dextro Energy World Championship Series	Madrid	53
2011-06-18	Dextro Energy World Championship Series	Kitzbuhel	40
2011-06-24	European Championships	Pontevedra	8
2011-06-26	European Championships (Elite Mix Relay)	Pontevedra	2
2011-07-03	European Cup	Penza	4

BG = the sponsor British Gas · DNF = did not finish · DNS = did not start
