= Daniel Lee (triathlete) =

Hong Kong triathlete (born 1977)

Personal information
- Born: Chi Wo Lee (Lee Chi Wo); April 9, 1977 (age 49) Hong Kong
Medal record
Men's triathlon
Representing Hong Kong
Asian Games
Silver medal – second place	2006 Doha	Individual
Asian Beach Games
Gold medal – first place	2008 Bali	Individual

Chi Wo "Daniel" Lee (Chinese: 李致和; Jyutping: lei^{5} zi^{3} wo^{4}, Lee Chi Wo, born April 9, 1977) is an athlete from Hong Kong. He competes in the triathlon.

Lee is the leading triathlete in Hong Kong, being the first triathlon representative from Hong Kong in the Sydney Olympic Games. Lee competed at the second Olympic triathlon at the 2004 Summer Olympics. He placed forty-third with a total time of 2:03:30.39. During the 2006 Asian Games he claimed the silver medal.

He graduated from the Chinese University of Hong Kong.

Lee Chi Wo is sponsored by Herbalife.
