= Natasha Tang =

Hong Kong swimmer (born 1992)

Personal information
- Full name: Tang Wing-yung
- Nationality: Hong Konger
- Born: 23 August 1992 (age 34) London, United Kingdom
- Height: 1.65 m (5 ft 5 in)
- Weight: 57 kg (126 lb)

Sport
- Sport: Swimming
- Strokes: freestyle
- College team: Ventura College
Medal record
Women's swimming
Representing Hong Kong
East Asian Games
| Silver medal – second place | 2009 Hong Kong | 1500 m freestyle |
Asian Beach Games
| Gold medal – first place | 2008 Bali | Marathon (5 km) |
| Bronze medal – third place | 2008 Bali | Marathon (10 km) |

Natasha Terri Tang (born Tang Wing-yung, Chinese: 鄧穎欣; Jyutping: dang^{6} wing^{6} jan^{1}; 23 August 1992) is a Hong Kong distance swimmer. At the 2012 Summer Olympics, she competed in the Women's marathon 10 kilometre, finishing in 20th place.
