= Kazakhstan at the 2008 Asian Beach Games =

- IOC code: KAZ
- NOC: National Olympic Committee of the Republic of Kazakhstan

in Bali
- Medals Ranked 15th: Gold 1 Silver 1 Bronze 2 Total 4

Asian Beach Games appearances
- 2008; 2010; 2012; 2014; 2016; 2026

Kazakhstan competed in the 2008 Asian Beach Games, held in Bali, Indonesia from October 18 to October 26, 2008, including in Women's Beach Volleyball on October 21, 2008.
