= China at the 2008 Asian Beach Games =

- IOC code: CHN
- NOC: Chinese Olympic Committee external link (in Chinese and English)

in Bali
- Medals Ranked 3rd: Gold 6 Silver 10 Bronze 7 Total 23

Asian Beach Games appearances
- 2008; 2010; 2012; 2014; 2016

China competed in the 2008 Asian Beach Games which were held in Bali, Indonesia from October 18, 2008 to October 26, 2008.

== See also ==
- China at the Asian Games
- China at the Olympics
- Sport in China
