= Beach volleyball at the Commonwealth Games =

Optional sport at the Commonwealth Games

Beach volleyball is an optional sport at the quadrennial Commonwealth Games. It first appeared at the 2018 Games with both men's and women's contests, followed by a second time at the 2022 Games.

== Venues ==
- (Australia) Gold Coast 2018: Coolangatta Beach, Coolangatta
- (England) Birmingham 2022: Smithfield, Birmingham

== Men's tournament ==
=== Results ===
Year	Host	Gold medal match			Bronze medal match			Teams
Year	Host	Gold medalists	Score	Silver medalists	Bronze medalists	Score	4th place	Teams
2018; Details	(Australia); Gold Coast	(Australia); Christopher McHugh and Damien Schumann	2–1	(Canada); Sam Pedlow and Sam Schachter	(New Zealand); Ben O'Dea and Sam O'Dea	2–0	(England); Chris Gregory and Jake Sheaf	12
2022; Details	(England); Birmingham	(Australia); Christopher McHugh and Paul Burnett	2-1	(Canada); Sam Schachter and Daniel Dearing	(England); Javier Bello and Joaquin Bello	2-0	(Rwanda); Venuste Gatsinzi and Olivier Ntagengwa	12

=== Performance by nation ===
Nation	(Australia); 2018 (12)	(England); 2022 (12)	Years
Australia	1st	1st	2
Canada	2nd	2nd	2
Cyprus	QF	QF	2
England	4th	3rd	2
Fiji	GS	-	1
Maldives	-	GS	1
Mozambique	GS	-	1
New Zealand	3rd	QF	2
Rwanda	-	4th	1
Saint Kitts and Nevis	GS	GS	2
Scotland	QF	-	1
Sierra Leone	QF	-	1
South Africa	-	GS	1
Sri Lanka	GS	QF	2
Gambia	-	QF	1
Trinidad and Tobago	QF	-	1
Tuvalu	-	GS	1
Total	12	12	24

Legend

- GP – Group stage / First round
- QF – Quarter Finals
- Q – The team has qualified for the tournament.
- TBD – Qualification ongoing; can still qualify.

== Women's tournament ==
=== Results ===
Year	Host	Gold medal match			Bronze medal match			Teams
Year	Host	Gold medalists	Score	Silver medalists	Bronze medalists	Score	4th place	Teams
2018; Details	(Australia); Gold Coast	(Canada); Melissa Humana-Paredes and Sarah Pavan	2–0	(Australia); Mariafe Artacho del Solar and Taliqua Clancy	(Vanuatu); Linline Matauatu and Miller Pata	2–0	(Cyprus); Manolina Konstantinou and Mariota Angelopoulou	12
2022; Details	(England); Birmingham	(Canada); Melissa Humana-Paredes and Sarah Pavan	2–1	(Australia); Mariafe Artacho del Solar and Taliqua Clancy	(Vanuatu); Miller Pata and Sherysyn Toko	2-1	(New Zealand); Alice Zeimann and Shaunna Polley	12

=== Performance by nation ===
Nation	(Australia); 2018 (12)	(England); 2022 (12)	Years
Australia	2nd	2nd	2
Canada	1st	1st	2
Cyprus	4th	QF	2
England	QF	QF	2
Fiji	GS	-	1
Ghana	-	GS	1
Grenada	GS	-	1
Kenya	-	GS	1
New Zealand	QF	4th	2
Rwanda	QF	-	1
Scotland	QF	QF	2
Singapore	GS	-	1
Solomon Islands	-	GS	1
Sri Lanka	-	QF	1
Trinidad and Tobago	GS	GS	2
Vanuatu	3rd	3rd	2
Total	12	12	24

Legend

- GP – Group stage / First round
- QF – Quarter Finals
- Q – The team has qualified for the tournament.
- TBD – Qualification ongoing; can still qualify.

== All-time medal table ==
Rank	Nation	Gold	Silver	Bronze	Total
1	Australia	2	2	0	4
1	Canada	2	2	0	4
3	Vanuatu	0	0	2	2
4	England	0	0	1	1
4	New Zealand	0	0	1	1
Totals (5 entries)		4	4	4	12

== See also ==
- Beach volleyball at the Summer Olympics
