= Vanuatu at the 2022 Commonwealth Games =

- Flag of Vanuatu
- CG code: VAN
- CGA: Vanuatu Association of Sports and National Olympic Committee
- Website: afcnovasanoc.wixsite.com/vasanoc

in Birmingham, England 28 July 2022 – 8 August 2022
- Competitors: 17 (7 men and 10 women) in 7 sports
- Flag bearers: Joe Mahit; Miller Pata; Ellie Enock
- Medals Ranked =40th: Gold 0 Silver 0 Bronze 1 Total 1

Commonwealth Games appearances (overview)
- 1982; 1986; 1990; 1994; 1998; 2002; 2006; 2010; 2014; 2018; 2022; 2026; 2030

Vanuatu competed at the 2022 Commonwealth Games at Birmingham, England from 28 July to 8 August 2022. It was Vanuatu's eleventh appearance at the Games.

The Vanuatu team consisted of 17 athletes. Judoka Joe Mahit, beach volleyball athlete Miller Pata and para-athlete/powerlifter Ellie Enock were the country's flagbearers during the opening ceremony.

== Medalists ==
Medal	Name	Sport	Event	Date
Bronze	Miller Pata; Sherysyn Toko	Beach volleyball	Women's tournament	7 August

== Competitors ==
The following is the list of number of competitors participating at the Games per sport/discipline.

Sport	Men	Women	Total
Athletics	2	2	4
Beach volleyball	0	2	2
Boxing	1	0	1
Judo	4	2	6
Para powerlifting	0	1	1
Table tennis	0	3	3
Weightlifting	0	1	1
Total	7	10 (Note: Total adjusted as one competitor (Elie Enock) is competing in athletics and para powerlifting.)	17

== Athletics ==
One para athlete was selected, having qualified via the World Para Athletics World Rankings for performances registered between 31 December 2020 and 25 April 2022. Another two athletes were selected as of 31 May 2022.

Men
Track and road events

Athlete	Event	Heat		Semifinal		Final	
Athlete	Event	Result	Rank	Result	Rank	Result	Rank
Obediah Timbaci	200 m	23.45	8	Did not advance			
Obediah Timbaci	400 m	51.62	7	Did not advance			

Field events

Athlete	Event	Qualification		Final	
Athlete	Event	Distance	Rank	Distance	Rank
Elstrom Wanemut	Long jump	DNS		Did not advance	
Elstrom Wanemut	Triple jump	—N/a		13.10	12

Women
Track and road events

Athlete	Event	Heat		Semifinal		Final	
Athlete	Event	Result	Rank	Result	Rank	Result	Rank
Chloe David	100 m	12.60	6	did not advance			
Chloe David	200 m	26.75	6	Did not advance			

Field events

Athlete	Event	Final	
Athlete	Event	Distance	Rank
Elie Enock	Shot put F57	7.70	6

== Beach volleyball ==
By virtue of their position in the extended FIVB Beach Volleyball World Rankings (based on performances between 16 April 2018 and 31 March 2022), Vanuatu qualified for the women's tournament. The pairing was decided shortly afterward.

Athlete	Event	Preliminary Round				Quarterfinals	Semifinals	Finals	Rank
Athlete	Event	Opposition Score	Opposition Score	Opposition Score	Rank	Opposition Score	Opposition Score	Opposition Score	Rank
Miller Pata; Sherysyn Toko	Women's tournament	Beattie / Coutts (SCO); W 2 - 0	Gwali / Donga (SOL); W 2 - 0	Grimson / Mumby (ENG); W 2 - 0	1 Q	Konstantopoulou / Konstantinou (CYP); W 2 - 0	Artacho / Clancy (AUS); L 0 - 2	Zeimann / Polley (NZL); W 2 - 1	3rd place, bronze medalist(s)

=== Women's tournament ===
Group C

Pos	Team	Pld	W	L	Pts	SW	SL	SR	SPW	SPL	SPR	Qualification
1	Pata – Toko (VAN)	3	3	0	6	6	0	MAX	126	67	1.881	Quarterfinals
2	Grimson – Mumby (ENG)	3	2	1	5	4	2	2.000	112	90	1.244	Quarterfinals
3	Beattie – Coutts (SCO)	3	1	2	4	2	4	0.500	98	106	0.925	Ranking of third-placed teams
4	Gwali – Donga (SOL)	3	0	3	3	0	6	0.000	53	126	0.421	

Source: birmingham2022.com

31 July 2022; 14:30	Pata – Toko (VAN)	2–0	Beattie – Coutts (SCO)	Smithfield
31 July 2022; 14:30	(21–10, 21–14); Report			Smithfield

2 August 2022; 15:30	Pata – Toko (VAN)	2–0	Gwali – Donga (SOL)	Smithfield
2 August 2022; 15:30	(21–8, 21–7); Report			Smithfield

4 August 2022; 19:00	Grimson – Mumby (ENG)	0–2	Pata – Toko (VAN)	Smithfield
4 August 2022; 19:00	(9–21, 19–21); Report			Smithfield

Quarterfinals

5 August 2022; 15:30	Pata – Toko (VAN)	2–0	Konstantopoulou – Konstantinou (CYP)	Smithfield
5 August 2022; 15:30	(29–27, 30–28); Report			Smithfield

Semifinals

6 August 2022; 21:00	Pata – Toko (VAN)	0–2	Artacho – Clancy (AUS)	Smithfield
6 August 2022; 21:00	(24–26, 16–21); Report			Smithfield

Bronze medal match

7 August 2022; 20:00	Zeimann – Polley (NZL)	1–2	Pata – Toko (VAN)	Smithfield
7 August 2022; 20:00	(21–10, 20–22, 10–15); Report			Smithfield

== Boxing ==
Men

Athlete	Event	Round of 16	Quarterfinals	Semifinals	Final	
Athlete	Event	Opposition Result	Opposition Result	Opposition Result	Opposition Result	Rank
Namri Berri	Flyweight	Panghal (IND); L 0 - 5	did not advance			

== Judo ==
Men

Athlete	Event	Round of 16	Quarterfinals	Semifinals	Repechage	Final/BM	
Athlete	Event	Opposition Result	Opposition Result	Opposition Result	Opposition Result	Opposition Result	Rank
Maxence Cugola	-66 kg	Saini (IND); L 00 - 10	did not advance				9
Joe Mahit	-73 kg	Matsoukatov (CYP); L 00 - 10	did not advance				9
Hugo Cumbo	-81 kg	Nikolic (AUS); L 00 - 10	did not advance				9
Marius Metois	-90 kg	—N/a	Petgrave (ENG); L 00 - 10	Did not advance	Bye	Cassar (AUS); L 00 - 10	5

Women

Athlete	Event	Round of 16	Quarterfinals	Semifinals	Repechage	Final/BM	
Athlete	Event	Opposition Result	Opposition Result	Opposition Result	Opposition Result	Opposition Result	Rank
Veronica Tari	-48 kg	Bye	Morand (MRI); L 00 - 10	Did not advance	Boniface (MAW); L 00 - 10	Did not advance	7
Mariel Kalomor	-52 kg	Marsh (SCO); L 00 - 11	did not advance				9

== Para powerlifting ==
One powerlifter was selected.

Athlete	Event	Result	Rank
Elie Enock	Women's heavyweight	52.8	8

== Table tennis ==
Singles

Athletes	Event	Group stage				Round of 32	Round of 16	Quarterfinal	Semifinal	Final / BM	
Athletes	Event	Opposition Score	Opposition Score	Opposition Score	Rank	Opposition Score	Opposition Score	Opposition Score	Opposition Score	Opposition Score	Rank
Roanna Abel	Women's singles	Oribamise (NGR); L 0 - 4	Mou (BAN); L 0 - 4	—N/a	3	did not advance					
Tracey Mawa	Women's singles	Yee (FIJ); L 1 - 4	Ho (MAS); L 0 - 4	Elliott (SCO); L 0 - 4	4	did not advance					
Stephanie Qwea	Women's singles	Li (FIJ); L 2 - 4	Fu (CAN); L 0 - 4	Nimal (MDV); L 1 - 4	4	did not advance					

Team

Athletes	Event	Group stage				Quarterfinal	Semifinal	Final / BM	
Athletes	Event	Opposition Score	Opposition Score	Opposition Score	Rank	Opposition Score	Opposition Score	Opposition Score	Rank
Tracey Mawa; Stephanie Qwea; Ronna Abel	Women's team	Wales; L 0 - 3	Canada; L 0 - 3	Uganda; L 0 - 3	4	did not advance			

== Weightlifting ==
Vanuatu accepted a Bipartite Invitation for the weightlifting competition and selected Ajah Pritchard-Lolo to compete.

Athlete	Event	Weight lifted		Total	Rank
Athlete	Event	Snatch	Clean & jerk	Total	Rank
Ajah Pritchard-Lolo	Women's 87 kg	78	100	178	8
