= Rwanda at the 2018 Commonwealth Games =

- Flag of Rwanda
- CGF code: RWA
- CGA: Rwanda National Olympic and Sports Committee
- Website: olympicrwanda.org

in Gold Coast, Australia 4 April 2018 – 15 April 2018
- Competitors: 17 in 4 sports
- Flag bearer: Salome Nyirarukundo (opening)
- Medals: Gold 0 Silver 0 Bronze 0 Total 0

Commonwealth Games appearances (overview)
- 2010; 2014; 2018; 2022; 2026; 2030

Rwanda competed at the 2018 Commonwealth Games in the Gold Coast, Australia from April 4 to April 15, 2018.

Track and field athlete Salome Nyirarukundo was the country's flag bearer during the opening ceremony.

== Competitors ==
The following is the list of number of competitors participating at the Games per sport/discipline.

Sport	Men	Women	Total
Athletics	3	3	6
Beach volleyball	0	2	2
Cycling	6	2	8
Powerlifting	1	0	1
Total	10	7	17

== Athletics ==
Men
Track & road events

Athlete	Event	Final	
Athlete	Event	Result	Rank
James Sugira	5000 m	14:03:51	7
Christophe Tuyishimire	5000 m	14:39:29	14
Alexis Nizeyimana	Marathon	Did not finish	

Women
Track & road events

Athlete	Event	Heat		Final	
Athlete	Event	Result	Rank	Result	Rank
Alice Ishimwe	800 m	2:11.36	8	Did not advance	
Beatha Nishimwe	1500 m	4:14.96	9	Did not advance	
Salome Nyirarukundo	10000 m	—		32:13.74	11

== Beach volleyball ==
Rwanda qualified a women's beach volleyball team, by winning the African qualification tournament held in October 2017.

Athlete	Event	Preliminary round	Standing	Quarterfinals	Semifinals	Final / BM	
Athlete	Event	Opposition Score	Standing	Opposition Score	Opposition Score	Opposition Score	Rank
Charlotte Nzayisenga; Denyse Mutatsimpundu	Women's	Pool C Wills – Polley (NZL); L 0–2 (14–21, 16–21); Matauatu – Pata (VAN); L 0–2 (15–21, 10–21); Lau – Ong (SGP); W 2–0 (21–11, 22–20)	3 q	Artacho del Solar – Clancy (AUS); L 0–2 (9–21, 8–21)	Did not advance		

== Cycling ==
Rwanda participated with 8 athletes (6 men and 2 women).

=== Road ===
Men

Athlete	Event	Time	Rank
Joseph Areruya	Road race	3:59:39	37
Didier Munyaneza	Road race	3:58:00	23
Valens Ndayisenga	Road race	DNF	
Jean Paul Ukiniwabo	Road race	DNF	
Jean Claude Uwizeye	Road race	3:57:58	21
Bonaventure Uwizeyimana	Road race	3:58:01	24
Joseph Areruya	Time trial	52:24.16	13
Valens Ndayisenga	Time trial	54:06.50	24

Women

Athlete	Event	Time	Rank
Beatha Ingabire	Road race	DNF	
Magnifique Manizabayo	Road race	DNF	

== Powerlifting ==
Rwanda participated with 1 athlete (1 man).

Athlete	Event	Result	Rank
Vedaste Niyonzima	Men's lightweight	141.2	9

== See also ==
- Rwanda at the 2018 Summer Youth Olympics
