= Grenada at the 2018 Commonwealth Games =

- Flag of Grenada
- CG code: GRN
- CGA: The Grenada Olympic Committee
- Website: grenadaolympic.com

in Gold Coast, Australia 4 April 2018 – 15 April 2018
- Competitors: 14 in 4 sports
- Medals Ranked 25th: Gold 1 Silver 0 Bronze 1 Total 2

Commonwealth Games appearances (overview)
- 1970; 1974; 1978; 1982; 1986–1994; 1998; 2002; 2006; 2010; 2014; 2018; 2022; 2026; 2030

Grenada competed at the 2018 Commonwealth Games in the Gold Coast, Australia from April 4 to April 15, 2018. It was Grenada's 10th appearance at the Commonwealth Games.

The Grenadian team consisted of 15 athletes (11 men and four women) that competed across four sports. However, only 14 competed.

== Medalists ==
| Medal | Name | Sport | Event | Date |
|---|---|---|---|---|
| Gold | Lindon Victor | Athletics | Men's Decathlon | April 10 |
| Bronze | Anderson Peters | Athletics | Men's Javelin Throw | April 14 |

== Competitors ==
The following is the list of number of competitors participating at the Games per sport/discipline.

| Sport | Men | Women | Total |
|---|---|---|---|
| Athletics | 7 | 1 | 8 |
| Beach volleyball | 0 | 2 | 2 |
| Boxing | 2 | 0 | 2 |
| Swimming | 1 | 1 | 2 |
| Total | 10 | 4 | 14 |

== Athletics ==
Grenada participated with 8 athletes (7 men and 1 woman).

Men
Track & road events

| Athlete | Event | Heat | | Semifinal | | Final | |
| Athlete | Event | Result | Rank | Result | Rank | Result | Rank |
|---|---|---|---|---|---|---|---|
| Royan Marcelle | 200 m | 21.58 | 7 | did not advance | | | |
| Royan Marcelle | 400 m | 46.78 | 5 q | 48.62 | 8 | did not advance | |
| Bralon Taplin | 400 m | 45.11 | 1 Q | 45.44 | 1 Q | 45.38 | 5 |

Field events

| Athlete | Event | Qualification | | Final | |
| Athlete | Event | Distance | Rank | Distance | Rank |
|---|---|---|---|---|---|
| Melvin Echard | Long jump | 7.29 | 20 | did not advance | |
| Gennard Paul | Javelin throw | 60.16 | 20 | did not advance | |
| Anderson Peters | Javelin throw | 80.44 | 3 Q | 82.20 | 3rd place, bronze medalist(s) |

Combined events – Decathlon

| Athlete | Event | 100 m | LJ | SP | HJ | 400 m | 110H | DT | PV | JT | 1500 m | Final | Rank |
|---|---|---|---|---|---|---|---|---|---|---|---|---|---|
| Kurt Felix | Result | 11.20 | 7.26 | 15.24 | 1.95 | 50.49 | 15.25 | 48.04 | 4.20 | 67.47 | 5:04.32 | 7756 | 4 |
| Kurt Felix | Points | 817 | 876 | 804 | 758 | 792 | 820 | 830 | 673 | 851 | 535 | 7756 | 4 |
| Lindon Victor | Result | 10.70 | 7.24 | 15.79 | 2.01 | 49.48 | 14.87 | 52.32 | 4.60 | 71.10 | 5:04.75 | 8303 | 1st place, gold medalist(s) |
| Lindon Victor | Points | 929 | 871 | 838 | 813 | 839 | 865 | 919 | 790 | 906 | 533 | 8303 | 1st place, gold medalist(s) |

Women
Track & road events

| Athlete | Event | Heat | | Semifinal | | Final | |
| Athlete | Event | Result | Rank | Result | Rank | Result | Rank |
|---|---|---|---|---|---|---|---|
| Kanika Beckles | 400 m | 53.34 | 4 Q | 53.80 | 6 | did not advance | |

== Beach volleyball ==
Grenada received a wildcard for a women's beach volleyball team of two athletes.

| Athlete | Event | Preliminary round | Standing | Quarterfinals | Semifinals | Final / BM | |
| Athlete | Event | Opposition Score | Standing | Opposition Score | Opposition Score | Opposition Score | Rank |
|---|---|---|---|---|---|---|---|
| Renisha Stafford; Thornia Williams | Women's | Pool A Beattie – Coutts (SCO); L 0 - 2 (8 - 21, 11 - 21); Del Solar – Clancy (AUS); L 0 - 2 (2 - 21, 11 - 21); Konstantinou – Angelopoulou (CYP); L 0 - 2 (3 - 21, 14 - 21) | 4 | did not advance | | | |

== Boxing ==
Grenada participated with a team of 2 athletes (2 men)

Men

| Athlete | Event | Round of 32 | Round of 16 | Quarterfinals | Semifinals | Final | Rank |
| Athlete | Event | Opposition Result | Opposition Result | Opposition Result | Opposition Result | Opposition Result | Rank |
|---|---|---|---|---|---|---|---|
| Jonathan Francois | −69 kg | Boniface (SEY); W 5 - 0 | McCormack (ENG); L KO | did not advance | | | |
| Joshua Redhead | −75 kg | Sommerville (AUS); L RSC | did not advance | | | | |

== Swimming ==
Grenada participated with 2 athletes (1 man and 1 woman).

Men

| Athlete | Event | Heat | | Semifinal | | Final | |
| Athlete | Event | Time | Rank | Time | Rank | Time | Rank |
|---|---|---|---|---|---|---|---|
| Corey Ollivierre | 50 m freestyle | 25.71 | 52 | did not advance | | | |
| Corey Ollivierre | 50 m breaststroke | 29.85 | 20 | did not advance | | | |
| Corey Ollivierre | 100 m breaststroke | 1:08.59 | 24 | did not advance | | | |

Women

| Athlete | Event | Heat | | Semifinal | | Final | |
| Athlete | Event | Time | Rank | Time | Rank | Time | Rank |
|---|---|---|---|---|---|---|---|
| Oreoluwa Cherebin | 50 m freestyle | 28.38 | 26 | did not advance | | | |
| Oreoluwa Cherebin | 50 m breaststroke | 34.86 | 23 | did not advance | | | |
| Oreoluwa Cherebin | 100 m breaststroke | 1:17.29 | 25 | did not advance | | | |
| Oreoluwa Cherebin | 50 m butterfly | 30.43 | 24 | did not advance | | | |

== See also ==
- Grenada at the 2018 Summer Youth Olympics
