= Beach volleyball at the 2018 Commonwealth Games =

- Venue: Coolangatta Beachfront
- Dates: 6–12 April 2018
- Competitors: 48 from 16 nations

Beach volleyball at the 2018 Commonwealth Games was held on the Gold Coast, Australia from 6 to 12 April. The beach volleyball competition was held at Coolangatta Beachfront. This was the first time that Beach Volleyball was held at the Commonwealth Games with last being the 1996 Atlanta Olympics, 2000 Sydney Olympics, 2004 Athens Olympics, 2008 Beijing Olympics, 2012 London Olympics and 2016 Rio Olympics. A total of twelve men's and twelve women's teams are scheduled to compete (48 athletes, at 2 per team) in each respective tournament.

== Competition schedule ==
The following is the competition schedule for the Beach Volleyball competitions:

P	Pool stage	¼	Quarter-finals	½	Semi-finals	B	Bronze medal match	G	Gold medal match

Event↓/Date →	Fri 6	Sat 7	Sun 8	Mon 9	Tue 10	Wed 11	Thu 12	
Men	P	P	P	P	¼	½	B	G
Women	P	P	P	P	¼	½	B	G

== Medal table ==
* Host nation (Australia)

Rank	Nation	Gold	Silver	Bronze	Total
1	Australia*	1	1	0	2
1	Canada	1	1	0	2
3	New Zealand	0	0	1	1
3	Vanuatu	0	0	1	1
Totals (4 entries)		2	2	2	6

== Medalists ==
Event	Gold	Silver	Bronze
Men's tournament	Australia; Chris McHugh; Damien Schumann	Canada; Sam Pedlow; Sam Schachter	New Zealand; Ben O'Dea; Sam O'Dea
Women's tournament	Canada; Melissa Humana-Paredes; Sarah Pavan	Australia; Mariafe Artacho del Solar; Taliqua Clancy	Vanuatu; Linline Matauatu; Miller Pata

== Qualification ==
A total of 12 men's teams and women's team qualified to compete at the games.

=== Men ===
Event	Date	Location	Vacancies	Qualified
Host Nation	—N/a	—N/a	1	Australia
FIVB Beach Volleyball World Rankings	31 October 2017	—N/a	4	Canada; England; Trinidad and Tobago; New Zealand
European Qualification Tournament	15–16 September 2017	(Cyprus) Larnaca	1	Scotland
AVC Beach Tour 2017	8 April – 28 October 2017	Various	1	Sri Lanka
African Qualification Tournament	27–29 October 2017	(Sierra Leone) Freetown	1	Sierra Leone
NORCECA Beach Volleyball Tour 2017	7 April – 13 November 2017	Various	1	Saint Kitts and Nevis
Oceania Qualification Tournament	6–8 December 2017	(Vanuatu) Port Vila	1	Fiji
FIVB/CGF Invitation	TBD	—N/a	2	Cyprus; Mozambique
Total			12	

=== Women ===
Event	Date	Location	Vacancies	Qualified
Host Nation	—N/a	—N/a	1	Australia
FIVB Beach Volleyball World Rankings	31 October 2017	—N/a	4	Canada; New Zealand; Vanuatu; England
European Qualification Tournament	15–16 September 2017	(Cyprus) Larnaca	1	Cyprus
AVC Beach Tour 2017	8 April – 28 October 2017	Various	1	Singapore
African Qualification Tournament	27–29 October 2017	(Sierra Leone) Freetown	1	Rwanda
NORCECA Beach Volleyball Tour 2017	7 April – 13 November 2017	Various	1	Trinidad and Tobago
Oceania Qualification Tournament	6–8 December 2017	(Vanuatu) Port Vila	1	Fiji
FIVB/CGF Invitation	TBD	—N/a	2	Scotland; Grenada
Total			12	

== Participating nations ==
There are 16 participating nations in beach volleyball with a total of 48 athletes.

- Australia (4 athletes)
- Canada (4)
- Cyprus (4)
- England (4)
- Fiji (4)
- Grenada (2)
- Mozambique (2)
- New Zealand (4)
- Rwanda (2)
- Saint Kitts and Nevis (2)
- Scotland (4)
- Sierra Leone (2)
- Singapore (2)
- Sri Lanka (2)
- Trinidad and Tobago (4)
- Vanuatu (2)
