= Beach volleyball at the 2022 Commonwealth Games – Women's tournament =

Beach volleyball – Women's tournament at the 2022 Commonwealth Games
- Venue: Smithfield
- Dates: 30 July – 7 August 2022
- Competitors: 24 from 12 nations

Medalists
gold medal	Melissa Humana-Paredes; Sarah Pavan	Canada
silver medal	Mariafe Artacho del Solar; Taliqua Clancy	Australia
bronze medal	Miller Pata; Sherysyn Toko	Vanuatu

The women's beach volleyball tournament at the 2022 Commonwealth Games will be held in Smithfield between 30 July and 7 August 2022.

== Schedule ==
All times based on British Summer Time (UTC+01:00)

Date	Time	Phase
30 July – 4 August	14:30	Group stage
30 July – 4 August	19:00	Group stage
5 August	14:30	Quarter-finals
5 August	19:00	Quarter-finals
6 August	20:00	Semi-finals
7 August	20:00	Bronze medal match
7 August	21:00	Gold medal match

== Qualification ==
Qualification for the tournament happened as follows:

Means of qualification	Date	Location	Quotas	Qualified
Host Nation	—	—	1	England
FIVB Beach Volleyball World Rankings	16 April 2018 – 31 March 2022	—	5	Canada; Australia; Vanuatu; New Zealand; Cyprus
Oceania Ranking (Note: The women's continental qualifiers for the Americas / Caribbean and Oceania were abandoned due to the COVID-19 pandemic, so the associated quota places were awarded to the highest-ranked nations from those regions.)	16 April 2018 – 31 March 2022	—	1	Solomon Islands
Americas / Caribbean Ranking	16 April 2018 – 31 March 2022	—	1	Trinidad and Tobago
European Qualifier	24–26 September 2021	(Scotland) Edinburgh	1	Scotland
Asian Qualifier	18–19 March 2022	(Sri Lanka) Negombo	1	Sri Lanka
African Qualifier	25–28 March 2022	(Ghana) Accra	1	Ghana
Bipartite Invitation	21 April 2022	—	1	Kenya
TOTAL			12	

Scheduling issues

== Competition format ==
In June 2022, twelve pairs were drawn into three groups; the top two performing pairs in each group, plus the two best third-place pairs advance to the knockout stage.

== Group stage ==
=== Pool A ===
Pos	Team	Pld	W	L	Pts	SW	SL	SR	SPW	SPL	SPR	Qualification
1	Humana-Paredes – Pavan (CAN)	3	3	0	6	6	0	MAX	137	73	1.877	Quarterfinals
2	Zeimann – Polley (NZL)	3	2	1	5	4	2	2.000	124	105	1.181	Quarterfinals
3	Khadambi – Makokha (KEN)	3	1	2	4	2	5	0.400	101	134	0.754	Ranking of third-placed teams
4	Aryee – Katadat (GHA)	3	0	3	3	1	6	0.167	86	138	0.623	

Source: birmingham2022.com

Qualified for the Quarterfinals

30 July 2022; 14:30	Humana-Paredes – Pavan (CAN)	2–0	Aryee – Katadat (GHA)	Smithfield
30 July 2022; 14:30	(21–7, 21–6); Report			Smithfield

30 July 2022; 19:00	Zeimann – Polley (NZL)	2–0	Khadambi – Makokha (KEN)	Smithfield
30 July 2022; 19:00	(21–10, 21–19); Report			Smithfield

1 August 2022; 14:30	Humana-Paredes – Pavan (CAN)	2–0	Khadambi – Makokha (KEN)	Smithfield
1 August 2022; 14:30	(21–15, 21–5); Report			Smithfield

1 August 2022; 19:00	Zeimann – Polley (NZL)	2–0	Aryee – Katadat (GHA)	Smithfield
1 August 2022; 19:00	(21–10, 21–13); Report			Smithfield

3 August 2022; 14:30	Khadambi – Makokha (KEN)	2–1	Aryee – Katadat (GHA)	Smithfield
3 August 2022; 14:30	(16–21, 21–13, 15–12); Report			Smithfield

3 August 2022; 19:00	Humana-Paredes – Pavan (CAN)	2–0	Zeimann – Polley (NZL)	Smithfield
3 August 2022; 19:00	(32–30, 21–10); Report			Smithfield

=== Pool B ===
Pos	Team	Pld	W	L	Pts	SW	SL	SR	SPW	SPL	SPR	Qualification
1	Artacho – Clancy (AUS)	3	3	0	6	6	0	MAX	126	62	2.032	Quarterfinals
2	Konstantopoulou – Konstantinou (CYP)	3	2	1	5	4	2	2.000	111	84	1.321	Quarterfinals
3	Bandara – Weerasinghe (SRI)	3	1	2	4	2	4	0.500	40	84	0.476	Ranking of third-placed teams
4	Armstrong – Chase (TTO)	3	0	3	3	0	6	0.000	37	126	0.294	

Source: birmingham2022.com

Qualified for the Quarterfinals

31 July 2022; 14:30	Artacho – Clancy (AUS)	2–0	Bandara – Weerasinghe (SRI)	Smithfield
31 July 2022; 14:30	(21–10, 21–12); Report			Smithfield

31 July 2022; 19:00	Konstantopoulou – Konstantinou (CYP)	2–0	Armstrong – Chase (TTO)	Smithfield
31 July 2022; 19:00	(21–7, 21–17); Report			Smithfield

2 August 2022; 14:30	Artacho – Clancy (AUS)	2–0	Armstrong – Chase (TTO)	Smithfield
2 August 2022; 14:30	(21–7, 21–6); Report			Smithfield

2 August 2022; 19:00	Konstantopoulou – Konstantinou (CYP)	2–0	Bandara – Weerasinghe (SRI)	Smithfield
2 August 2022; 19:00	(21–8, 21–10); Report			Smithfield

4 August 2022; 14:30	Artacho – Clancy (AUS)	2–0	Konstantopoulou – Konstantinou (CYP)	Smithfield
4 August 2022; 14:30	(21–14, 21–13); Report			Smithfield

4 August 2022; 19:00	Armstrong – Chase (TTO)	0–2	Bandara – Weerasinghe (SRI)	Smithfield
4 August 2022; 19:00	INJ; Report			Smithfield

=== Pool C ===
Pos	Team	Pld	W	L	Pts	SW	SL	SR	SPW	SPL	SPR	Qualification
1	Pata – Toko (VAN)	3	3	0	6	6	0	MAX	126	67	1.881	Quarterfinals
2	Grimson – Mumby (ENG)	3	2	1	5	4	2	2.000	112	90	1.244	Quarterfinals
3	Beattie – Coutts (SCO)	3	1	2	4	2	4	0.500	98	106	0.925	Ranking of third-placed teams
4	Gwali – Donga (SOL)	3	0	3	3	0	6	0.000	53	126	0.421	

Source: birmingham2022.com

31 July 2022; 14:30	Pata – Toko (VAN)	2–0	Beattie – Coutts (SCO)	Smithfield
31 July 2022; 14:30	(21–10, 21–14); Report			Smithfield

31 July 2022; 19:00	Grimson – Mumby (ENG)	2–0	Gwali – Donga (SOL)	Smithfield
31 July 2022; 19:00	(21–10, 21–6); Report			Smithfield

2 August 2022; 15:30	Pata – Toko (VAN)	2–0	Gwali – Donga (SOL)	Smithfield
2 August 2022; 15:30	(21–8, 21–7); Report			Smithfield

2 August 2022; 19:00	Grimson – Mumby (ENG)	2–0	Beattie – Coutts (SCO)	Smithfield
2 August 2022; 19:00	(21–17, 21–15); Report			Smithfield

4 August 2022; 14:30	Beattie – Coutts (SCO)	2–0	Gwali – Donga (SOL)	Smithfield
4 August 2022; 14:30	(21–6, 21–16); Report			Smithfield

4 August 2022; 19:00	Grimson – Mumby (ENG)	0–2	Pata – Toko (VAN)	Smithfield
4 August 2022; 19:00	(9–21, 19–21); Report			Smithfield

=== Ranking of third-placed teams ===
Pos	Grp	Team	Pld	W	L	Pts	SW	SL	SR	SPW	SPL	SPR	Qualification
1	C	Beattie – Coutts (SCO)	3	1	2	4	2	4	0.500	98	106	0.925	Quarterfinals
2	B	Bandara – Weerasinghe (SRI)	3	1	2	4	2	4	0.500	40	84	0.476	Quarterfinals
3	A	Khadambi – Makokha (KEN)	3	1	2	4	2	5	0.400	101	134	0.754	

Source: birmingham2022.com

== Knockout stage ==
Quarterfinals
A1	Humana-Paredes – Pavan (CAN)	21	21
B3	Bandara – Weerasinghe (SRI)	9	11
A2	Zeimann – Polley (NZL)	21	21
C2	Grimson – Mumby (ENG)	13	15
C1	Pata – Toko (VAN)	29	30
B2	Konstantopoulou – Konstantinou (CYP)	27	28
C3	Beattie – Coutts (SCO)	11	11
B1	Artacho – Clancy (AUS)	21	21

Semifinals
A1	Humana-Paredes – Pavan (CAN)	29	21	19
A2	Zeimann – Polley (NZL)	31	14	17
C1	Pata – Toko (VAN)	24	16
B1	Artacho – Clancy (AUS)	26	21

Gold medal match
A1	Humana-Paredes – Pavan (CAN)	22	21	15
B1	Artacho – Clancy (AUS)	24	17	12
Bronze medal match
A2	Zeimann – Polley (NZL)	21	20	10
C1	Pata – Toko (VAN)	10	22	15

=== Quarterfinals ===
5 August 2022; 14:30	Beattie – Coutts (SCO)	0–2	Artacho – Clancy (AUS)	Smithfield
5 August 2022; 14:30	(11–21, 11–21); Report			Smithfield

5 August 2022; 15:30	Pata – Toko (VAN)	2–0	Konstantopoulou – Konstantinou (CYP)	Smithfield
5 August 2022; 15:30	(29–27, 30–28); Report			Smithfield

5 August 2022; 20:00	Zeimann – Polley (NZL)	2–0	Grimson – Mumby (ENG)	Smithfield
5 August 2022; 20:00	(21–13, 21–15); Report			Smithfield

5 August 2022; 21:00	Humana-Paredes – Pavan (CAN)	2–0	Bandara – Weerasinghe (SRI)	Smithfield
5 August 2022; 21:00	(21–9, 21–11); Report			Smithfield

=== Semifinals ===
6 August 2022; 20:00	Humana-Paredes – Pavan (CAN)	2–1	Zeimann – Polley (NZL)	Smithfield
6 August 2022; 20:00	(29–31, 21–14, 19–17); Report			Smithfield

6 August 2022; 21:00	Pata – Toko (VAN)	0–2	Artacho – Clancy (AUS)	Smithfield
6 August 2022; 21:00	(24–26, 16–21); Report			Smithfield

=== Bronze medal match ===
7 August 2022; 20:00	Zeimann – Polley (NZL)	1–2	Pata – Toko (VAN)	Smithfield
7 August 2022; 20:00	(21–10, 20–22, 10–15); Report			Smithfield

=== Gold medal match ===
7 August 2022; 21:00	Humana-Paredes – Pavan (CAN)	2–1	Artacho – Clancy (AUS)	Smithfield
7 August 2022; 21:00	(22–24, 21–17, 15–12); Report			Smithfield
