= 2015 Asian Beach Volleyball Championships =

International beach volleyball competition

- Location: Hong Kong
- Dates: 1–4 October 2015

The 2015 Asian Beach Volleyball Championship was a beach volleyball event, that was held from October 1 to 4, 2015 in Hong Kong, China. The competition included only women's event.

== Medal summary ==
Event	Gold	Silver	Bronze
Women	Australia; Louise Bawden; Taliqua Clancy	Vanuatu; Linline Matauatu; Miller Pata	Australia; Mariafe Artacho del Solar; Nicole Laird

== Participating nations ==
- Australia (2)
- China (2)
- Chinese Taipei (2)
- Guam (2)
- Hong Kong (3)
- Indonesia (2)
- Japan (2)
- Kazakhstan (2)
- Macau (2)
- New Zealand (1)
- Thailand (2)
- Vanuatu (1)
- Vietnam (1)

== Tournament ==
=== Preliminary round ===
==== Pool A ====
Pos	Team	Pld	W	L	Pts	SW	SL	SR	SPW	SPL	SPR
1	(Vanuatu) Matauatu–Pata	2	2	0	4	4	0	MAX	84	32	2.625
2	(Kazakhstan) Samalikova–Lassyuta	2	1	1	3	2	2	1.000	65	65	1.000
3	(Macau) Law W.S.–Leong O.I.	2	0	2	2	0	4	0.000	32	84	0.381

Source: AVC

Date		Score		Set 1	Set 2	Set 3
01 Oct	Matauatu–Pata (Vanuatu)	2–0	(Macau) Law W.S.–Leong O.I.	21–5	21–4	
01 Oct	Samalikova–Lassyuta (Kazakhstan)	2–0	(Macau) Law W.S.–Leong O.I.	21–10	21–13	
02 Oct	Matauatu–Pata (Vanuatu)	2–0	(Kazakhstan) Samalikova–Lassyuta	21–9	21–14	

==== Pool B ====
Pos	Team	Pld	W	L	Pts	SW	SL	SR	SPW	SPL	SPR
1	(Japan) Take–Mizoe	2	2	0	4	4	0	MAX	84	27	3.111
2	(Hong Kong) Lo–Tam	2	1	1	3	2	2	1.000	60	72	0.833
3	(Macau) Lei S.K.–Lei W.S.	2	0	2	2	0	4	0.000	39	84	0.464

Source: AVC

Date		Score		Set 1	Set 2	Set 3
01 Oct	Take–Mizoe (Japan)	2–0	(Macau) Lei S.K.–Lei W.S.	21–4	21–5	
01 Oct	Lo–Tam (Hong Kong)	2–0	(Macau) Lei S.K.–Lei W.S.	21–18	21–12	
02 Oct	Take–Mizoe (Japan)	2–0	(Hong Kong) Lo–Tam	21–7	21–11	

==== Pool C ====
Pos	Team	Pld	W	L	Pts	SW	SL	SR	SPW	SPL	SPR
1	(Australia) Bawden–Clancy	2	2	0	4	4	0	MAX	84	44	1.909
2	(Chinese Taipei) Liu P.H.–Chang Y.C.	2	1	1	3	2	2	1.000	66	74	0.892
3	(Hong Kong) W.T. To–Koo	2	0	2	2	0	4	0.000	52	84	0.619

Source: AVC

Date		Score		Set 1	Set 2	Set 3
01 Oct	Bawden–Clancy (Australia)	2–0	(Chinese Taipei) Liu P.H.–Chang Y.C.	21–13	21–11	
01 Oct	W.T. To–Koo (Hong Kong)	0–2	(Chinese Taipei) Liu P.H.–Chang Y.C.	16–21	16–21	
02 Oct	Bawden–Clancy (Australia)	2–0	(Hong Kong) W.T. To–Koo	21–7	21–13	

==== Pool D ====
Pos	Team	Pld	W	L	Pts	SW	SL	SR	SPW	SPL	SPR
1	(Japan) Ishii–Murakami	2	2	0	4	4	0	MAX	84	56	1.500
2	(Kazakhstan) Mashkova–Tsimbalova	2	1	1	3	2	2	1.000	77	67	1.149
3	(Chinese Taipei) Kou Nai-han–Tsai T.J.	2	0	2	2	0	4	0.000	46	84	0.548

Source: AVC

Date		Score		Set 1	Set 2	Set 3
01 Oct	Mashkova–Tsimbalova (Kazakhstan)	2–0	(Chinese Taipei) Kou Nai-han–Tsai T.J.	21–12	21–13	
01 Oct	Ishii–Murakami (Japan)	2–0	(Chinese Taipei) Kou Nai-han–Tsai T.J.	21–9	21–12	
02 Oct	Mashkova–Tsimbalova (Kazakhstan)	0–2	(Japan) Ishii–Murakami	18–21	17–21	

==== Pool E ====
Pos	Team	Pld	W	L	Pts	SW	SL	SR	SPW	SPL	SPR
1	(Australia) Artacho del Solar–Laird	2	2	0	4	4	0	MAX	84	47	1.787
2	(New Zealand) Tilley–Polley	2	1	1	3	2	2	1.000	68	77	0.883
3	(Indonesia) Desi–Ayu	2	0	2	2	0	4	0.000	56	84	0.667

Source: AVC

Date		Score		Set 1	Set 2	Set 3
01 Oct	Artacho del Solar–Laird (Australia)	2–0	(Indonesia) Desi–Ayu	21–11	21–10	
01 Oct	Tilley–Polley (New Zealand)	2–0	(Indonesia) Desi–Ayu	21–18	21–17	
02 Oct	Artacho del Solar–Laird (Australia)	2–0	(New Zealand) Tilley–Polley	21–11	21–15	

==== Pool F ====
Pos	Team	Pld	W	L	Pts	SW	SL	SR	SPW	SPL	SPR
1	(China) Chen Chunxia–Tang N.Y.	2	2	0	4	4	0	MAX	84	54	1.556
2	(Thailand) Radarong–Udomchavee	2	1	1	3	2	2	1.000	80	51	1.569
3	Guam–Guam	2	0	2	2	0	4	0.000	25	84	0.298

Source: AVC

Date		Score		Set 1	Set 2	Set 3
01 Oct	Radarong–Udomchavee (Thailand)	2–0	Guam–Guam	21–5	21–4	
01 Oct	Chen Chunxia–Tang N.Y. (China)	2–0	Guam–Guam	21–7	21–9	
02 Oct	Radarong–Udomchavee (Thailand)	0–2	(China) Chen Chunxia–Tang N.Y.	19–21	19–21	

==== Pool G ====
Pos	Team	Pld	W	L	Pts	SW	SL	SR	SPW	SPL	SPR
1	(China) Y.Y. Ma–X.Y. Xia	2	2	0	4	4	0	MAX	84	67	1.254
2	(Thailand) Numwong–Hongpak	2	1	1	3	2	2	1.000	78	70	1.114
3	(Vietnam) Huỳnh–Hồng	2	0	2	2	0	4	0.000	59	84	0.702

Source: AVC

Date		Score		Set 1	Set 2	Set 3
01 Oct	Y.Y. Ma–X.Y. Xia (China)	2–0	(Vietnam) Huỳnh–Hồng	21–15	21–16	
01 Oct	Numwong–Hongpak (Thailand)	2–0	(Vietnam) Huỳnh–Hồng	21–17	21–11	
02 Oct	Y.Y. Ma–X.Y. Xia (China)	2–0	(Thailand) Numwong–Hongpak	21–18	21–18	

==== Pool H ====
Pos	Team	Pld	W	L	Pts	SW	SL	SR	SPW	SPL	SPR
1	(Indonesia) Dhita–Putu	2	2	0	4	4	0	MAX	84	49	1.714
2	(Hong Kong) Cat–Yuen Mei	2	1	1	3	2	2	1.000	71	59	1.203
3	Guam–Hammond	2	0	2	2	0	4	0.000	37	84	0.440

Source: AVC

Date		Score		Set 1	Set 2	Set 3
01 Oct	Cat–Yuen Mei (Hong Kong)	2–0	Guam–Hammond	21–12	21–5	
01 Oct	Dhita–Putu (Indonesia)	2–0	Guam–Hammond	21–8	21–12	
02 Oct	Cat–Yuen Mei (Hong Kong)	0–2	(Indonesia) Dhita–Putu	13–21	16–21	

=== Knockout round ===
Round of 16; 3 October
(Vanuatu) Matauatu–Pata	21	21
(New Zealand) Tilley–Polley	14	13
(Indonesia) Dhita–Putu	21	21
(Kazakhstan) Samalikova–Lassyuta	12	15
(Australia) Artacho del Solar–Laird	21	21
(Hong Kong) Lo–Tam	12	11
(Japan) Ishii–Murakami	21	21
(Thailand) Numwong–Hongpak	9	10
(Australia) Bawden–Clancy	21	21
(Thailand) Radarong–Udomchavee	16	9
(China) Chen Chunxia–Tang N.Y.	21	16	15
(Chinese Taipei) Liu P.H.–Chang Y.C.	15	21	9
(China) Y.Y. Ma–X.Y. Xia	21	21
(Hong Kong) Cat–Yuen Mei	14	10
(Japan) Take–Mizoe	10	21	12
(Kazakhstan) Mashkova–Tsimbalova	21	19	15

Quarterfinals; 3 October
(Vanuatu) Matauatu–Pata	21	21
(Indonesia) Dhita–Putu	11	19
(Australia) Artacho del Solar–Laird	17	21	15
(Japan) Ishii–Murakami	21	11	13
(Australia) Bawden–Clancy	22	21
(China) Chen Chunxia–Tang N.Y.	20	15
(China) Y.Y. Ma–X.Y. Xia	21	21
(Kazakhstan) Mashkova–Tsimbalova	14	17

Semifinals; 4 October
(Vanuatu) Matauatu–Pata	21	21
(Australia) Artacho del Solar–Laird	17	15
(Australia) Bawden–Clancy	21	21
(China) Y.Y. Ma–X.Y. Xia	16	13

Final; 4 October
(Vanuatu) Matauatu–Pata	16	15
(Australia) Bawden–Clancy	21	21
3rd place
(Australia) Artacho del Solar–Laird	21	21
(China) Y.Y. Ma–X.Y. Xia	16	14
