= 2018 Asian Beach Volleyball Championships =

Beach Volleyball Competition

- Location: Satun, Thailand
- Dates: 24–28 September 2018

The 2018 Asian Beach Volleyball Championship was a beach volleyball event, that was held from 24 to 28 September, 2018 in Satun, Thailand.

== Medal summary ==
Event	Gold	Silver	Bronze
Men	Qatar; Ahmed Tijan; Cherif Younousse	Iran; Bahman Salemi; Arash Vakili	Kazakhstan; Alexey Sidorenko; Alexandr Dyachenko
Women	Australia; Taliqua Clancy; Mariafe Artacho del Solar	China; Wang Fan; Xue Chen	Japan; Miki Ishii; Megumi Murakami

== Participating nations ==
=== Men ===
- Australia (3)
- China (3)
- Chinese Taipei (2)
- Hong Kong (2)
- Indonesia (2)
- Iran (2)
- Japan (3)
- Kazakhstan (3)
- Malaysia (2)
- Maldives (1)
- New Zealand (2)
- Oman (2)
- Qatar (2)
- Saudi Arabia (1)
- Singapore (2)
- Thailand (4)

=== Women ===
- Australia (2)
- China (3)
- Chinese Taipei (2)
- Hong Kong (2)
- Indonesia (1)
- Japan (3)
- Kazakhstan (3)
- Malaysia (1)
- New Zealand (1)
- Singapore (2)
- Thailand (5)
- Vanuatu (1)

== Men's tournament ==
=== Qualification ===
Date		Score		Set 1	Set 2	Set 3
24 Sep	Hsu C.W.–Wu S.S. (Chinese Taipei)	2–0	(Maldives) Shiunaz–Ismail	21–13	21–13	
24 Sep	D. Kitti–N. Banlue (Thailand)	2–0	(Hong Kong) Pong–Wong	21–17	21–18	
24 Sep	Ali–Dhia (Saudi Arabia)	2–0	(Singapore) Choo W.J.B.–Yeo S.P.	21–18	21–18	
24 Sep	Gee J.W.–Radzi (Malaysia)	0–2	(Qatar) Mahmoud–Tamer	12–21	12–21	

=== Preliminary round ===
==== Pool A ====
Pos	Team	Pld	W	L	Pts	SW	SL	SR	SPW	SPL	SPR
1	(Japan) Ageba–Nishimura	3	3	0	6	6	2	3.000	153	136	1.125
2	(Thailand) I. Nuttanon–P. Sedtawat	3	2	1	5	5	3	1.667	144	133	1.083
3	(Qatar) Mahmoud–Tamer	3	1	2	4	4	5	0.800	153	154	0.994
4	(Hong Kong) Lam–Chui	3	0	3	3	1	6	0.167	110	137	0.803

Source: AVC

Date		Score		Set 1	Set 2	Set 3
25 Sep	I. Nuttanon–P. Sedtawat (Thailand)	2–1	(Qatar) Mahmoud–Tamer	18–21	21–15	15–12
25 Sep	Lam–Chui (Hong Kong)	0–2	(Japan) Ageba–Nishimura	19–21	17–21	
25 Sep	I. Nuttanon–P. Sedtawat (Thailand)	1–2	(Japan) Ageba–Nishimura	15–21	21–17	12–15
25 Sep	Lam–Chui (Hong Kong)	1–2	(Qatar) Mahmoud–Tamer	12–21	21–17	9–15
26 Sep	I. Nuttanon–P. Sedtawat (Thailand)	2–0	(Hong Kong) Lam–Chui	21–15	21–17	
26 Sep	Ageba–Nishimura (Japan)	2–1	(Qatar) Mahmoud–Tamer	25–23	18–21	15–8

==== Pool B ====
Pos	Team	Pld	W	L	Pts	SW	SL	SR	SPW	SPL	SPR
1	(Qatar) Ahmed Tijan–Cherif	3	3	0	6	6	0	MAX	126	89	1.416
2	(Oman) Nouh–Mazin	3	2	1	5	4	3	1.333	137	124	1.105
3	(Singapore) Tay Z.H.K.–Shen	3	1	2	4	3	5	0.600	129	154	0.838
4	(Saudi Arabia) Ali–Dhia	3	0	3	3	1	6	0.167	115	140	0.821

Source: AVC

Date		Score		Set 1	Set 2	Set 3
25 Sep	Ahmed Tijan–Cherif (Qatar)	2–0	(Saudi Arabia) Ali–Dhia	21–12	21–14	
25 Sep	Nouh–Mazin (Oman)	2–1	(Singapore) Tay Z.H.K.–Shen	22–24	21–12	15–11
25 Sep	Ahmed Tijan–Cherif (Qatar)	2–0	(Singapore) Tay Z.H.K.–Shen	21–15	21–11	
25 Sep	Nouh–Mazin (Oman)	2–0	(Saudi Arabia) Ali–Dhia	21–19	21–16	
26 Sep	Ahmed Tijan–Cherif (Qatar)	2–0	(Oman) Nouh–Mazin	21–19	21–18	
26 Sep	Tay Z.H.K.–Shen (Singapore)	2–1	(Saudi Arabia) Ali–Dhia	19–21	22–20	15–13

==== Pool C ====
Pos	Team	Pld	W	L	Pts	SW	SL	SR	SPW	SPL	SPR
1	(China) P. Gao–Y. Li	3	3	0	6	6	1	6.000	138	92	1.500
2	(Indonesia) Gilang–Imtaq	3	2	1	5	4	3	1.333	132	131	1.008
3	(Malaysia) Raja Nazmi–Rafi	3	1	2	4	2	4	0.500	101	88	1.148
4	(Chinese Taipei) Hsu C.W.–Wu S.S.	3	0	3	3	2	6	0.333	97	157	0.618

Source: AVC

Date		Score		Set 1	Set 2	Set 3
25 Sep	P. Gao–Y. Li (China)	2–1	(Chinese Taipei) Hsu C.W.–Wu S.S.	21–10	18–21	15–10
25 Sep	Gilang–Imtaq (Indonesia)	2–0	(Malaysia) Raja Nazmi–Rafi	25–23	21–10	
25 Sep	P. Gao–Y. Li (China)	2–0	(Malaysia) Raja Nazmi–Rafi	21–14	21–12	
25 Sep	Gilang–Imtaq (Indonesia)	2–1	(Chinese Taipei) Hsu C.W.–Wu S.S.	21–15	18–21	22–20
26 Sep	P. Gao–Y. Li (China)	2–0	(Indonesia) Gilang–Imtaq	21–10	21–15	
26 Sep	Raja Nazmi–Rafi (Malaysia)	2–0	(Chinese Taipei) Hsu C.W.–Wu S.S.	Walkover		

==== Pool D ====
Pos	Team	Pld	W	L	Pts	SW	SL	SR	SPW	SPL	SPR
1	(China) Ha Likejiang–Wu Jiaxin	3	3	0	6	6	0	MAX	137	119	1.151
2	(Australia) Dickson–Ferguson	3	2	1	5	4	2	2.000	120	102	1.176
3	(New Zealand) Watson–O'Dea	3	1	2	4	2	4	0.500	112	117	0.957
4	(Thailand) D. Kitti–N. Banlue	3	0	3	3	0	6	0.000	100	131	0.763

Source: AVC

Date		Score		Set 1	Set 2	Set 3
25 Sep	Ha Likejiang–Wu Jiaxin (China)	2–0	(Thailand) D. Kitti–N. Banlue	26–24	21–19	
25 Sep	Dickson–Ferguson (Australia)	2–0	(New Zealand) Watson–O'Dea	21–11	21–19	
25 Sep	Ha Likejiang–Wu Jiaxin (China)	2–0	(New Zealand) Watson–O'Dea	21–15	27–25	
25 Sep	Dickson–Ferguson (Australia)	2–0	(Thailand) D. Kitti–N. Banlue	21–15	21–15	
26 Sep	Ha Likejiang–Wu Jiaxin (China)	2–0	(Australia) Dickson–Ferguson	21–19	21–17	
26 Sep	Watson–O'Dea (New Zealand)	2–0	(Thailand) D. Kitti–N. Banlue	21–14	21–13	

==== Pool E ====
Pos	Team	Pld	W	L	Pts	SW	SL	SR	SPW	SPL	SPR
1	(Iran) Salemi B.–A. Vakili	3	2	1	5	5	3	1.667	152	128	1.188
2	(Kazakhstan) Bogatu–Yakovlev	3	2	1	5	5	3	1.667	147	137	1.073
3	(Australia) McHugh–Schubert	3	2	1	5	5	3	1.667	152	150	1.013
4	(Japan) Shoji–Ikeda	3	0	3	3	0	6	0.000	98	134	0.731

Source: AVC

Date		Score		Set 1	Set 2	Set 3
25 Sep	McHugh–Schubert (Australia)	2–0	(Japan) Shoji–Ikeda	29–27	21–13	
25 Sep	Salemi B.–A. Vakili (Iran)	2–1	(Kazakhstan) Bogatu–Yakovlev	20–22	21–16	15–11
25 Sep	McHugh–Schubert (Australia)	1–2	(Kazakhstan) Bogatu–Yakovlev	20–22	21–19	12–15
25 Sep	Salemi B.–A. Vakili (Iran)	2–0	(Japan) Shoji–Ikeda	21–18	21–12	
26 Sep	McHugh–Schubert (Australia)	2–1	(Iran) Salemi B.–A. Vakili	22–20	12–21	15–13
26 Sep	Bogatu–Yakovlev (Kazakhstan)	2–0	(Japan) Shoji–Ikeda	21–15	21–13	

==== Pool F ====
Pos	Team	Pld	W	L	Pts	SW	SL	SR	SPW	SPL	SPR
1	(Australia) Durant–Schumann	3	3	0	6	6	1	6.000	137	113	1.212
2	(Thailand) N. Phichakon–T. Phanupong	3	2	1	5	4	4	1.000	136	146	0.932
3	(Japan) Shimizu–Hasegawa	3	1	2	4	4	4	1.000	144	136	1.059
4	(Oman) Ahmed–Haitham	3	0	3	3	1	6	0.167	115	137	0.839

Source: AVC

Date		Score		Set 1	Set 2	Set 3
25 Sep	Durant–Schumann (Australia)	2–0	(Thailand) N. Phichakon–T. Phanupong	21–17	21–16	
25 Sep	Shimizu–Hasegawa (Japan)	2–0	(Oman) Ahmed–Haitham	21–19	21–14	
25 Sep	Durant–Schumann (Australia)	2–0	(Oman) Ahmed–Haitham	21–16	21–13	
25 Sep	Shimizu–Hasegawa (Japan)	1–2	(Thailand) N. Phichakon–T. Phanupong	21–14	17–21	13–15
26 Sep	Durant–Schumann (Australia)	2–1	(Japan) Shimizu–Hasegawa	17–21	21–18	15–12
26 Sep	Ahmed–Haitham (Oman)	1–2	(Thailand) N. Phichakon–T. Phanupong	21–17	19–21	13–15

==== Pool G ====
Pos	Team	Pld	W	L	Pts	SW	SL	SR	SPW	SPL	SPR
1	(Kazakhstan) Sidorenko–Dyachenko	3	3	0	6	6	0	MAX	126	97	1.299
2	(Thailand) J. Surin–K. Adisorn	3	2	1	5	4	3	1.333	126	131	0.962
3	(China) Li Zhuoxin–Ch.W. Zhou	3	1	2	4	2	4	0.500	116	122	0.951
4	(Chinese Taipei) Wang C.J.–Hsieh Y.J.	3	0	3	3	1	6	0.167	120	138	0.870

Source: AVC

Date		Score		Set 1	Set 2	Set 3
25 Sep	J. Surin–K. Adisorn (Thailand)	0–2	(Kazakhstan) Sidorenko–Dyachenko	14–21	17–21	
25 Sep	Li Zhuoxin–Ch.W. Zhou (China)	2–0	(Chinese Taipei) Wang C.J.–Hsieh Y.J.	21–18	22–20	
25 Sep	J. Surin–K. Adisorn (Thailand)	2–1	(Chinese Taipei) Wang C.J.–Hsieh Y.J.	23–21	15–21	15–12
25 Sep	Li Zhuoxin–Ch.W. Zhou (China)	0–2	(Kazakhstan) Sidorenko–Dyachenko	19–21	19–21	
26 Sep	J. Surin–K. Adisorn (Thailand)	2–0	(China) Li Zhuoxin–Ch.W. Zhou	21–19	21–16	
26 Sep	Wang C.J.–Hsieh Y.J. (Chinese Taipei)	0–2	(Kazakhstan) Sidorenko–Dyachenko	18–21	10–21	

==== Pool H ====
Pos	Team	Pld	W	L	Pts	SW	SL	SR	SPW	SPL	SPR
1	(Iran) Raoufi R.–A. Mirzaali	3	3	0	6	6	0	MAX	129	95	1.358
2	(New Zealand) Nicklin–Hartles	3	2	1	5	4	3	1.333	125	133	0.940
3	(Kazakhstan) Kuleshov–Babichev	3	1	2	4	3	5	0.600	133	148	0.899
4	(Indonesia) Ashfiya–Rendy Verdian	3	0	3	3	1	6	0.167	131	142	0.923

Source: AVC

Date		Score		Set 1	Set 2	Set 3
25 Sep	Raoufi R.–A. Mirzaali (Iran)	2–0	(New Zealand) Nicklin–Hartles	21–12	21–14	
25 Sep	Ashfiya–Rendy Verdian (Indonesia)	1–2	(Kazakhstan) Kuleshov–Babichev	19–21	21–17	11–15
25 Sep	Raoufi R.–A. Mirzaali (Iran)	2–0	(Kazakhstan) Kuleshov–Babichev	21–13	21–16	
25 Sep	Ashfiya–Rendy Verdian (Indonesia)	0–2	(New Zealand) Nicklin–Hartles	19–21	21–23	
26 Sep	Raoufi R.–A. Mirzaali (Iran)	2–0	(Indonesia) Ashfiya–Rendy Verdian	21–18	24–22	
26 Sep	Kuleshov–Babichev (Kazakhstan)	1–2	(New Zealand) Nicklin–Hartles	21–19	19–21	11–15

=== Knockout round ===
Round of 16; 26 September
(Japan) Ageba–Nishimura	21	21
(Indonesia) Gilang–Imtaq	14	16
(Thailand) N. Phichakon–T. Phanupong	18	18
(Iran) Salemi B.–A. Vakili	21	21
(Australia) Durant–Schumann	21	21
(Australia) Dickson–Ferguson	16	19
(Kazakhstan) Bogatu–Yakovlev	21	21
(China) P. Gao–Y. Li	17	17
(China) Ha Likejiang–Wu Jiaxin	21	19	13
(New Zealand) Nicklin–Hartles	15	21	15
(Oman) Nouh–Mazin	12	18
(Kazakhstan) Sidorenko–Dyachenko	21	21
(Iran) Raoufi R.–A. Mirzaali	21	21
(Thailand) J. Surin–K. Adisorn	19	13
(Thailand) I. Nuttanon–P. Sedtawat	13	16
(Qatar) Ahmed Tijan–Cherif	21	21

Quarterfinals; 27 September
(Japan) Ageba–Nishimura	13	11
(Iran) Salemi B.–A. Vakili	21	21
(Australia) Durant–Schumann	20	16
(Kazakhstan) Bogatu–Yakovlev	22	21
(New Zealand) Nicklin–Hartles	12	21	11
(Kazakhstan) Sidorenko–Dyachenko	21	19	15
(Iran) Raoufi R.–A. Mirzaali	14	19
(Qatar) Ahmed Tijan–Cherif	21	21

Semifinals; 27 September
(Iran) Salemi B.–A. Vakili	21	21
(Kazakhstan) Bogatu–Yakovlev	13	15
(Kazakhstan) Sidorenko–Dyachenko	15	14
(Qatar) Ahmed Tijan–Cherif	21	21

Final; 28 September
(Iran) Salemi B.–A. Vakili	18	11
(Qatar) Ahmed Tijan–Cherif	21	21
3rd place
(Kazakhstan) Bogatu–Yakovlev	14	16
(Kazakhstan) Sidorenko–Dyachenko	21	21

== Women's tournament ==
=== Preliminary round ===
==== Pool A ====
Pos	Team	Pld	W	L	Pts	SW	SL	SR	SPW	SPL	SPR
1	(Thailand) Radarong–Hongpak	2	2	0	4	4	1	4.000	98	73	1.342
2	(Kazakhstan) Samalikova–Rachenko	2	1	1	3	3	2	1.500	92	79	1.165
3	(Indonesia) Yokebad–Sari	2	0	2	2	0	4	0.000	46	84	0.548

Source: AVC

Date		Score		Set 1	Set 2	Set 3
25 Sep	Samalikova–Rachenko (Kazakhstan)	2–0	(Indonesia) Yokebad–Sari	21–10	21–13	
25 Sep	Radarong–Hongpak (Thailand)	2–0	(Indonesia) Yokebad–Sari	21–10	21–13	
26 Sep	Radarong–Udomchavee (Thailand)	2–1	(Kazakhstan) Samalikova–Rachenko	19–21	21–15	16–14

==== Pool B ====
Pos	Team	Pld	W	L	Pts	SW	SL	SR	SPW	SPL	SPR
1	(Australia) Clancy–Artacho del Solar	2	2	0	4	4	0	MAX	84	50	1.680
2	(Thailand) Pawarun–Thatsarida	2	1	1	3	2	2	1.000	73	69	1.058
3	(Malaysia) Shu Woon–Zhi Ling	2	0	2	2	0	4	0.000	46	84	0.548

Source: AVC

Date		Score		Set 1	Set 2	Set 3
25 Sep	Pawarun–Thatsarida (Thailand)	2–0	(Malaysia) Shu Woon–Zhi Ling	21–14	21–13	
26 Sep	Clancy–Artacho del Solar (Australia)	2–0	(Malaysia) Shu Woon–Zhi Ling	21–8	21–11	
26 Sep	Clancy–Artacho del Solar (Australia)	2–0	(Thailand) Pawarun–Thatsarida	21–18	21–13	

==== Pool C ====
Pos	Team	Pld	W	L	Pts	SW	SL	SR	SPW	SPL	SPR
1	(Japan) Ishii–Murakami	2	2	0	4	4	0	MAX	88	39	2.256
2	(China) Zhu Lingdi–M.M. Lin	2	1	1	3	2	2	1.000	81	79	1.025
3	(Thailand) Sumintra–Anchana	2	0	2	2	0	4	0.000	33	84	0.393

Source: AVC

Date		Score		Set 1	Set 2	Set 3
25 Sep	Zhu Lingdi–M.M. Lin (China)	2–0	(Thailand) Sumintra–Anchana	21–18	21–15	
26 Sep	Ishii–Murakami (Japan)	2–0	(Thailand) Sumintra–Anchana	Walkover		
26 Sep	Ishii–Murakami (Japan)	2–0	(China) Zhu Lingdi–M.M. Lin	25–23	21–16	

==== Pool D ====
Pos	Team	Pld	W	L	Pts	SW	SL	SR	SPW	SPL	SPR
1	(China) Wang X.X.–X.Y. Xia	2	2	0	4	4	1	4.000	96	74	1.297
2	(Kazakhstan) Mashkova–Tsimbalova	2	1	1	3	3	2	1.500	93	75	1.240
3	(Singapore) E. Chong–Lau E.S.	2	0	2	2	0	4	0.000	44	84	0.524

Source: AVC

Date		Score		Set 1	Set 2	Set 3
25 Sep	Mashkova–Tsimbalova (Kazakhstan)	2–0	(Singapore) E. Chong–Lau E.S.	21–12	21–9	
26 Sep	Wang X.X.–X.Y. Xia (China)	2–0	(Singapore) E. Chong–Lau E.S.	21–9	21–14	
26 Sep	Wang X.X.–X.Y. Xia (China)	2–1	(Kazakhstan) Mashkova–Tsimbalova	13–21	21–12	20–18

==== Pool E ====
Pos	Team	Pld	W	L	Pts	SW	SL	SR	SPW	SPL	SPR
1	(China) Wang–Xue	2	2	0	4	4	0	MAX	84	46	1.826
2	(Chinese Taipei) Yu Y.H.–Pan T.Y.	2	1	1	3	2	3	0.667	78	97	0.804
3	(Kazakhstan) Zhuk–Yeropkina	2	0	2	2	1	4	0.250	80	99	0.808

Source: AVC

Date		Score		Set 1	Set 2	Set 3
25 Sep	Yu Y.H.–Pan T.Y. (Chinese Taipei)	2–1	(Kazakhstan) Zhuk–Yeropkina	21–23	21–19	15–13
26 Sep	Wang–Xue (China)	2–0	(Kazakhstan) Zhuk–Yeropkina	21–15	21–10	
26 Sep	Wang–Xue (China)	2–0	(Chinese Taipei) Yu Y.H.–Pan T.Y.	21–10	21–11	

==== Pool F ====
Pos	Team	Pld	W	L	Pts	SW	SL	SR	SPW	SPL	SPR
1	(Thailand) Udomchavee–Numwong	2	2	0	4	4	1	4.000	96	75	1.280
2	(Australia) Laird–Kendall	2	1	1	3	3	2	1.500	90	89	1.011
3	(Vanuatu) Toko–Pata	2	0	2	2	0	4	0.000	62	84	0.738

Source: AVC

Date		Score		Set 1	Set 2	Set 3
25 Sep	Laird–Kendall (Australia)	2–0	(Vanuatu) Toko–Pata	21–17	21–18	
26 Sep	Udomchavee–Numwong (Thailand)	2–0	(Vanuatu) Toko–Pata	21–13	21–14	
26 Sep	Udomchavee–Numwong (Thailand)	2–1	(Australia) Laird–Kendall	21–19	18–21	15–8

==== Pool G ====
Pos	Team	Pld	W	L	Pts	SW	SL	SR	SPW	SPL	SPR
1	(New Zealand) Kirwan–MacDonald	3	3	0	6	6	0	MAX	128	100	1.280
2	(Japan) Take–Kusano	3	2	1	5	4	2	2.000	124	87	1.425
3	(Hong Kong) W.Y. Au Yeung–Yuen T.C.	3	1	2	4	2	4	0.500	97	109	0.890
4	(Singapore) Y.T.R. Lau–Lim F.T.J.	3	0	3	3	0	6	0.000	73	126	0.579

Source: AVC

Date		Score		Set 1	Set 2	Set 3
25 Sep	Take–Kusano (Japan)	0–2	(New Zealand) Kirwan–MacDonald	21–23	19–21	
25 Sep	W.Y. Au Yeung–Yuen T.C. (Hong Kong)	2–0	(Singapore) Y.T.R. Lau–Lim F.T.J.	21–11	21–14	
26 Sep	Take–Kusano (Japan)	2–0	(Singapore) Y.T.R. Lau–Lim F.T.J.	21–14	21–8	
26 Sep	W.Y. Au Yeung–Yuen T.C. (Hong Kong)	0–2	(New Zealand) Kirwan–MacDonald	17–21	17–21	
26 Sep	Take–Kusano (Japan)	2–0	(Hong Kong) W.Y. Au Yeung–Yuen T.C.	21–12	21–9	
26 Sep	Y.T.R. Lau–Lim F.T.J. (Singapore)	0–2	(New Zealand) Kirwan–MacDonald	10–21	16–21	

==== Pool H ====
Pos	Team	Pld	W	L	Pts	SW	SL	SR	SPW	SPL	SPR
1	(Chinese Taipei) Kou N.H.–Liu P.H.	3	3	0	6	6	0	MAX	126	65	1.938
2	(Japan) Mizoe–Hashimoto	3	2	1	5	4	2	2.000	116	88	1.318
3	(Hong Kong) W.T. To–C.Y. Kong	3	1	2	4	2	5	0.400	97	131	0.740
4	(Thailand) Tangkaeo–Jiraporn	3	0	3	3	1	6	0.167	83	138	0.601

Source: AVC

Date		Score		Set 1	Set 2	Set 3
25 Sep	Mizoe–Hashimoto (Japan)	2–0	(Thailand) Tangkaeo–Jiraporn	21–9	21–14	
25 Sep	Kou N.H.–Liu P.H. (Chinese Taipei)	2–0	(Hong Kong) W.T. To–C.Y. Kong	21–13	21–7	
26 Sep	Mizoe–Hashimoto (Japan)	2–0	(Hong Kong) W.T. To–C.Y. Kong	21–13	21–10	
26 Sep	Kou N.H.–Liu P.H. (Chinese Taipei)	2–0	(Thailand) Tangkaeo–Jiraporn	21–5	21–8	
26 Sep	Mizoe–Hashimoto (Japan)	0–2	(Chinese Taipei) Kou N.H.–Liu P.H.	14–21	18–21	
26 Sep	W.T. To–C.Y. Kong (Hong Kong)	2–1	(Thailand) Tangkaeo–Jiraporn	21–18	18–21	15–8

=== Knockout round ===
Round of 16; 27 September
(Thailand) Radarong–Hongpak	21	21
(China) Zhu Lingdi–M.M. Lin	18	19
(Kazakhstan) Samalikova–Rachenko	9	11
(China) Wang–Xue	21	21
(Chinese Taipei) Kou N.H.–Liu P.H.	21	21
(Thailand) Pawarun–Thatsarida	16	6
(Australia) Laird–Kendall	12	14
(China) Wang X.X.–X.Y. Xia	21	21
(Japan) Ishii–Murakami	21	21
(Chinese Taipei) Yu Y.H.–Pan T.Y.	12	10
(Kazakhstan) Mashkova–Tsimbalova	21	21
(Thailand) Udomchavee–Numwong	13	11
(New Zealand) Kirwan–MacDonald	21	9
(Japan) Mizoe–Hashimoto	23	21
(Japan) Take–Kusano	14	16
(Australia) Clancy–Artacho del Solar	21	21

Quarterfinals; 27 September
(Thailand) Radarong–Hongpak	12	27
(China) Wang–Xue	21	29
(Chinese Taipei) Kou N.H.–Liu P.H.	16	13
(China) Wang X.X.–X.Y. Xia	21	21
(Japan) Ishii–Murakami	21	21
(Kazakhstan) Mashkova–Tsimbalova	15	18
(Japan) Mizoe–Hashimoto	13	13
(Australia) Clancy–Artacho del Solar	21	21

Semifinals; 28 September
(China) Wang–Xue	W	O
(China) Wang X.X.–X.Y. Xia
(Japan) Ishii–Murakami	14	19
(Australia) Clancy–Artacho del Solar	21	21

Final; 28 September
(China) Wang–Xue	17	21	9
(Australia) Clancy–Artacho del Solar	21	19	15
3rd place
(China) Wang X.X.–X.Y. Xia	21	10	11
(Japan) Ishii–Murakami	18	21	15
