= Beach volleyball at the 2018 Commonwealth Games – Women's tournament =

Beach Volleyball – Women's tournament at the 2018 Commonwealth Games
- Venue: Coolangatta Beachfront
- Dates: 6–12 April 2018
- Competitors: 24 from 12 nations

Medalists
| gold medal | Melissa Humana-Paredes; Sarah Pavan | Canada |
| silver medal | Mariafe Artacho del Solar; Taliqua Clancy | Australia |
| bronze medal | Linline Matauatu; Miller Pata | Vanuatu |

The women's beach volleyball tournament at the 2018 Commonwealth Games was held on the Gold Coast, Australia from April 6 to 12. The beach volleyball competition was held at Coolangatta Beachfront. This was the first time that beach volleyball was held at the Commonwealth Games. A total of twelve women's teams competed (24 athletes, at 2 per team).

== Competition schedule ==
The following is the competition schedule for the women's tournament:

| P | Pool stage | ¼ | Quarter-finals | ½ | Semi-finals | B | Bronze medal match | G | Gold medal match |

| Event↓/Date → | Fri 6 | Sat 7 | Sun 8 | Mon 9 | Tue 10 | Wed 11 | Thu 12 | |
|---|---|---|---|---|---|---|---|---|
| Women | P | P | P | P | 1/4 | 1/2 | B | G |

== Qualification ==
A total of 12 men's teams qualified to compete at the games.

| Event | Date | Location | Vacancies | Qualified |
|---|---|---|---|---|
| Host Nation | —N/a | —N/a | 1 | Australia |
| FIVB Beach Volleyball World Rankings | 31 October 2017 | —N/a | 4 | Canada; New Zealand; Vanuatu; England |
| European Qualification Tournament | 15–16 September 2017 | (Cyprus) Larnaca | 1 | Cyprus |
| AVC Beach Tour 2017 | 8 April – 28 October 2017 | Various | 1 | Singapore |
| African Qualification Tournament | 27–29 October 2017 | (Sierra Leone) Freetown | 1 | Rwanda |
| NORCECA Beach Volleyball Tour 2017 | 7 April – 13 November 2017 | Various | 1 | Trinidad and Tobago |
| Oceania Qualification Tournament | 6–8 December 2017 | (Vanuatu) Port Vila | 1 | Fiji |
| FIVB/CGF Invitation | TBD | —N/a | 2 | Scotland; Grenada |
| Total | | | 12 | |

== Medalists ==
| Event | Gold | Silver | Bronze |
|---|---|---|---|
| Women's tournament | Canada; Melissa Humana-Paredes; Sarah Pavan | Australia; Mariafe Artacho del Solar; Taliqua Clancy | Vanuatu; Linline Matauatu; Miller Pata |

== Pools composition ==
The 12 teams would be split into three groups of four, with the top two teams in each group along with the two best third place teams advancing to the knockout round. Canada was the top ranked nation, followed by Australia, New Zealand and Vanuatu. These four were placed in the three pools in a snake pattern. The remaining eight teams were randomly drawn among the other three pools.

== Preliminary round ==
- All times are AEST (UTC−10:00).

=== Pool A ===
| | PLD | W | L | SW | SL | SR | P |
|---|---|---|---|---|---|---|---|
| Artacho del Solar – Clancy (AUS) | 3 | 3 | 0 | 6 | 0 | MAX | 6 |
| Konstantinou – Angelopoulou (CYP) | 3 | 2 | 1 | 4 | 2 | 2.000 | 5 |
| Beattie – Coutts (SCO) | 3 | 1 | 2 | 2 | 4 | 0.500 | 4 |
| Stafford – Williams (GRN) | 3 | 0 | 3 | 0 | 6 | 0.000 | 3 |

| Qualified for the quarterfinals |

| 6 April 2018; 12:30 | Beattie – Coutts (SCO) | 2–0 | Stafford – Williams (GRN) | Coolangatta Beachfront |
| 6 April 2018; 12:30 | 21–8, 21–11; Report | | | Coolangatta Beachfront |

| 6 April 2018; 15:00 | Artacho del Solar – Clancy (AUS) | 2–0 | Konstantinou – Angelopoulou (CYP) | Coolangatta Beachfront |
| 6 April 2018; 15:00 | 21–14, 21–9; Report | | | Coolangatta Beachfront |

| 7 April 2018; 17:00 | Artacho del Solar – Clancy (AUS) | 2–0 | Stafford – Williams (GRN) | Coolangatta Beachfront |
| 7 April 2018; 17:00 | 21–2, 21–11; Report | | | Coolangatta Beachfront |

| 7 April 2018; 19:30 | Beattie – Coutts (SCO) | 0–2 | Konstantinou – Angelopoulou (CYP) | Coolangatta Beachfront |
| 7 April 2018; 19:30 | 8–21, 16–21; Report | | | Coolangatta Beachfront |

| 8 April 2018; 21:30 | Artacho del Solar – Clancy (AUS) | 2–0 | Beattie – Coutts (SCO) | Coolangatta Beachfront |
| 8 April 2018; 21:30 | 21–9, 21–9; Report | | | Coolangatta Beachfront |

| 9 April 2018; 10:30 | Stafford – Williams (GRN) | 0–2 | Konstantinou – Angelopoulou (CYP) | Coolangatta Beachfront |
| 9 April 2018; 10:30 | 3–21, 14–21; Report | | | Coolangatta Beachfront |

=== Pool B ===
| | PLD | W | L | SW | SL | SR | P |
|---|---|---|---|---|---|---|---|
| Humana-Paredes – Pavan (CAN) | 3 | 3 | 0 | 6 | 0 | MAX | 6 |
| Grimson – Palmer (ENG) | 3 | 2 | 1 | 4 | 2 | 2.000 | 5 |
| Blackman – Grant (TTO) | 3 | 1 | 2 | 2 | 4 | 0.500 | 4 |
| Ratudina – Nima (FIJ) | 3 | 0 | 3 | 0 | 6 | 0.000 | 3 |

| Qualified for the quarterfinals |

| 6 April 2018; 19:30 | Humana-Paredes – Pavan (CAN) | 2–0 | Ratudina – Nima (FIJ) | Coolangatta Beachfront |
| 6 April 2018; 19:30 | 21–5, 21–8; Report | | | Coolangatta Beachfront |

| 6 April 2018; 20:30 | Grimson – Palmer (ENG) | 2–0 | Blackman – Grant (TTO) | Coolangatta Beachfront |
| 6 April 2018; 20:30 | 21–16, 21–12; Report | | | Coolangatta Beachfront |

| 8 April 2018; 10:30 | Humana-Paredes – Pavan (CAN) | 2–0 | Blackman – Grant (TTO) | Coolangatta Beachfront |
| 8 April 2018; 10:30 | 21–7, 21–8; Report | | | Coolangatta Beachfront |

| 8 April 2018; 11:30 | Grimson – Palmer (ENG) | 2–0 | Ratudina – Nima (FIJ) | Coolangatta Beachfront |
| 8 April 2018; 11:30 | 21–9, 21–7; Report | | | Coolangatta Beachfront |

| 9 April 2018; 20:30 | Blackman – Grant (TTO) | 2–0 | Ratudina – Nima (FIJ) | Coolangatta Beachfront |
| 9 April 2018; 20:30 | 21–18, 24–22; Report | | | Coolangatta Beachfront |

| 9 April 2018; 21:30 | Humana-Paredes – Pavan (CAN) | 2–0 | Grimson – Palmer (ENG) | Coolangatta Beachfront |
| 9 April 2018; 21:30 | 21–6, 21–6; Report | | | Coolangatta Beachfront |

=== Pool C ===
| | PLD | W | L | SW | SL | SR | P |
|---|---|---|---|---|---|---|---|
| Wills – Polley (NZL) | 3 | 3 | 0 | 6 | 0 | MAX | 6 |
| Matauatu – Pata (VAN) | 3 | 2 | 1 | 4 | 2 | 2.000 | 5 |
| Nzayisenga – Mutatsimpundu (RWA) | 3 | 1 | 2 | 2 | 4 | 0.500 | 4 |
| Lau – Ong (SGP) | 3 | 0 | 3 | 0 | 6 | 0.000 | 3 |

| Qualified for the quarterfinals |

| 7 April 2018; 11:30 | Matauatu – Pata (VAN) | 2–0 | Lau – Ong (SGP) | Coolangatta Beachfront |
| 7 April 2018; 11:30 | 21–9, 21–12; Report | | | Coolangatta Beachfront |

| 7 April 2018; 12:30 | Wills – Polley (NZL) | 2–0 | Nzayisenga – Mutatsimpundu (RWA) | Coolangatta Beachfront |
| 7 April 2018; 12:30 | 21–14, 21–16; Report | | | Coolangatta Beachfront |

| 8 April 2018; 16:00 | Wills – Polley (NZL) | 2–0 | Lau – Ong (SGP) | Coolangatta Beachfront |
| 8 April 2018; 16:00 | 21–16, 21–5; Report | | | Coolangatta Beachfront |

| 8 April 2018; 17:00 | Matauatu – Pata (VAN) | 2–0 | Nzayisenga – Mutatsimpundu (RWA) | Coolangatta Beachfront |
| 8 April 2018; 17:00 | 21–15, 21–10; Report | | | Coolangatta Beachfront |

| 9 April 2018; 15:00 | Lau – Ong (SGP) | 0–2 | Nzayisenga – Mutatsimpundu (RWA) | Coolangatta Beachfront |
| 9 April 2018; 15:00 | 11–21, 20–22; Report | | | Coolangatta Beachfront |

| 9 April 2018; 16:00 | Wills – Polley (NZL) | 2–0 | Matauatu – Pata (VAN) | Coolangatta Beachfront |
| 9 April 2018; 16:00 | 21–17, 21–16; Report | | | Coolangatta Beachfront |

== Knockout round ==
Quarterfinals
Artacho del Solar – Clancy (AUS) | 21 | 21
Nzayisenga – Mutatsimpundu (RWA) | 9 | 8
Matauatu – Pata (VAN) | 23 | 21 | 15
Grimson – Palmer (ENG) | 25 | 19 | 12
Wills – Polley (NZL) | 10 | 17
Konstantinou – Angelopoulou (CYP) | 21 | 21
Beattie – Coutts (SCO) | 9 | 9
Humana-Paredes – Pavan (CAN) | 21 | 21

Semifinals
Artacho del Solar – Clancy (AUS) | 21 | 16 | 15
Matauatu – Pata (VAN) | 19 | 21 | 9
Konstantinou – Angelopoulou (CYP) | 7 | 12
Humana-Paredes – Pavan (CAN) | 21 | 21

Gold medal match
Artacho del Solar – Clancy (AUS) | 19 | 20
Humana-Paredes – Pavan (CAN) | 21 | 22
Bronze medal match
Matauatu – Pata (VAN) | 21 | 21
Konstantinou – Angelopoulou (CYP) | 14 | 10

=== Quarterfinals ===
| 10 April 2018; 15:00 | Matauatu – Pata (VAN) | 2–1 | Grimson – Palmer (ENG) | Coolangatta Beachfront |
| 10 April 2018; 15:00 | 23–25, 21–19, 15–12; Report | | | Coolangatta Beachfront |

| 10 April 2018; 16:00 | Artacho del Solar – Clancy (AUS) | 2–0 | Nzayisenga – Mutatsimpundu (RWA) | Coolangatta Beachfront |
| 10 April 2018; 16:00 | 21–9, 21–8; Report | | | Coolangatta Beachfront |

| 10 April 2018; 20:30 | Wills – Polley (NZL) | 0–2 | Konstantinou – Angelopoulou (CYP) | Coolangatta Beachfront |
| 10 April 2018; 20:30 | 10–21, 17–21; Report | | | Coolangatta Beachfront |

| 10 April 2018; 21:30 | Beattie – Coutts (SCO) | 0–2 | Humana-Paredes – Pavan (CAN) | Coolangatta Beachfront |
| 10 April 2018; 21:30 | 9–21, 9–21; Report | | | Coolangatta Beachfront |

=== Semifinals ===
| 11 April 2018; 19:30 | Konstantinou – Angelopoulou (CYP) | 0–2 | Humana-Paredes – Pavan (CAN) | Coolangatta Beachfront |
| 11 April 2018; 19:30 | 7–21, 12–21; Report | | | Coolangatta Beachfront |

| 11 April 2018; 20:30 | Artacho del Solar – Clancy (AUS) | 2–1 | Matauatu – Pata (VAN) | Coolangatta Beachfront |
| 11 April 2018; 20:30 | 21–19, 16–21, 15–9; Report | | | Coolangatta Beachfront |

=== Bronze medal match ===
| 11 April 2018; 19:30 | Matauatu – Pata (VAN) | 2–0 | Konstantinou – Angelopoulou (CYP) | Coolangatta Beachfront |
| 11 April 2018; 19:30 | 21–14, 21–10; Report | | | Coolangatta Beachfront |

=== Gold medal match ===
| 12 April 2018; 20:30 | Artacho del Solar – Clancy (AUS) | 0–2 | Humana-Paredes – Pavan (CAN) | Coolangatta Beachfront |
| 12 April 2018; 20:30 | 19–21, 20–22; Report | | | Coolangatta Beachfront |
