= Louise Bawden =

Australian beach volleyball player

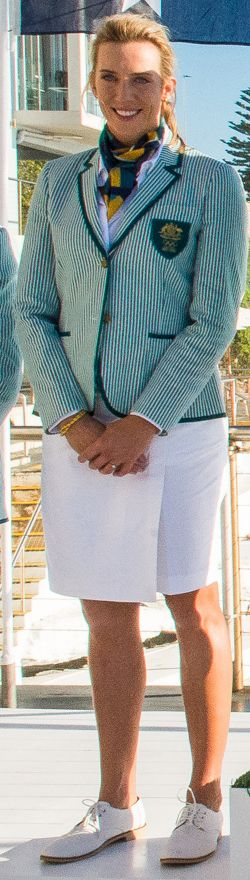
- Bawden in 2016

Personal information
- Nationality: Australia
- Born: 7 August 1981 (age 45); Melbourne, Victoria, Australia
- Height: 183 cm (6 ft 0 in)
- Weight: 72 kg (159 lb)

Beach volleyball information
Years	Teammate
2013–2017	Taliqua Clancy
Honours
Women's beach volleyball
Representing Australia
World Tour
Bronze medal – third place	2015 Porec	Beach
Asian Championships
Gold medal – first place	2017 Songkhla	Beach
Gold medal – first place	2015 Hong Kong	Beach
Gold medal – first place	2014 Jinjiang	Beach

Louise Bawden (born 7 August 1981) is an Australian indoor and beach volleyball player. She represented Australia at the 2000 Summer Olympics in indoor volleyball, finishing in 9th. She was selected to represent Australia at the 2012 Summer Olympics in beach volleyball, but she and team-mate Becchara Palmer did not qualify from the pool stage.

== Personal life ==
Bawden was born in Melbourne, Victoria and attended Fintona Girls' School. She spent her childhood in Melbourne, moving to Canberra when she was sixteen. She then moved to the Netherlands after the Sydney Olympics, returning to Australia in 2003. In 2008, she completed a degree at a university in Queensland. She attended the 2008 Summer Olympics as a fan. As of 2012, she lives in Adelaide.

She is married to fellow beach volleyball player Casey Grice and they have a son and daughter.

== Indoor volleyball ==
Bawden earned a volleyball scholarship at the Australian Institute of Sport when she was sixteen years old. As a nineteen-year-old, she represented Australia at the 2000 Summer Olympics in indoor volleyball, where her team finished ninth. Following the Sydney Games, she played professional volleyball in the Netherlands until 2003. In 2002, she competed in the World Championships.

== Beach volleyball ==
Bawden is a beach volleyball player. Following the 2008 Summer Olympics, she approached the Adelaide-based Australian beach volley programme about the possibility of getting into the sport. Following this, in 2009, she became involved with Australia's National Beach Volleyball Program, making a switch from indoor to beach and was initially teamed up with Becchara Palmer. That year, she shared the world beach volleyball association top rookie award with Angie Akers, an American.

At the 2009 Mazury Open in Stare Jablonki, Poland, Bawden and partner Palmer finished second. The competition was part of the FIVB World Tour. She and Palmer twice won the Australian Championships, once in 2010 and again in 2011.

In 2011, Palmer and Bawden were Australia's number one ranked team, and the duo finished ninth at the 2011 World Championships. With her partner Palmer, she finished seventeenth at the 2011 FIVB Moscow World Tour in Moscow, Russia. With her partner, she finished fourth at the 2011 FIVB Phuket World Tour in Phuket, Thailand.

In 2012, Bawden and Palmer played in 31 matches, winning 20 of them. This increased their world ranking to 16. With her partner, she finished ninth at the 2012 FIVB Brasília World Tour in Brasília, Brazil. With her partner, she finished fifth at the 2012 FIVB Sanya World Tour in Sanya, China. With her partner, she finished seventeenth at the 2012 FIVB Shanghai World Tour in Shanghai, China. With her partner, she finished ninth at the 2012 FIVB Beijing World Tour in Beijing, China. With her partner, she finished ninth at the 2012 FIVB Rome World Tour in Rome, Italy, which secured her Olympic berth. With her partner, she finished fifth at the 2012 FIVB Moscow World Tour in Moscow, Russia.

Bawden was selected to represent Australia at the 2012 Summer Olympics in beach volleyball, in June 2012 following a selection process that was 18 months long and involved becoming one of the sixteen top ranked teams in the world. Going into the Olympics, her team was ranked fourteenth in the world, but did not qualify from the pool stages.

She participated in the 2016 Summer Olympics in Rio with partner Taliqua Clancy, and made it to the Quarter-finals.

Awards
Preceded by Bibiana Candelas (MEX)	Women's FIVB World Tour "Top Rookie" alongside (United States) Angie Akers; 2009	Succeeded by Markéta Sluková (CZE)
