= Beach volleyball at the 2019 Pacific Games =

- Venue: Apia Waterfront
- Dates: 8–12 July

The beach volleyball competitions for men's and women's teams at the 2019 Pacific Games was held in Apia, Samoa on 8–12 July 2019 at the Apia Waterfront.

== Teams ==
The nations competing were:

- American Samoa
- Australia
- Cook Islands
- Guam
- Kiribati
- Marshall Islands
- Nauru
- New Caledonia
- Northern Mariana Islands
- Palau
- Papua New Guinea
- Samoa
- Solomon Islands
- (French Polynesia) Tahiti
- Tonga
- Tuvalu
- Vanuatu

== Medal summary ==
=== Medal table ===
Rank	Nation	Gold	Silver	Bronze	Total
1	Australia	1	0	0	1
1	Vanuatu	1	0	0	1
3	Tahiti	0	2	0	2
4	American Samoa	0	0	1	1
4	Tonga	0	0	1	1
Totals (5 entries)		2	2	2	6

=== Results ===
Event	Gold	Silver	Bronze
Men's tournament	Australia; Tim Dickson; Marcus Ferguson	Tahiti; Terau Ena; Jeremie Paraue	Tonga; Semisi Funaki; Tio Fonohema
Women's tournament	Vanuatu; Miller Pata; Sherysyn Toko	Tahiti; Vaihere Fareura; Emere Maau	American Samoa; Litara Keil; Deveney Pula

== Men's tournament ==
=== Pool stage ===
The sixteen beach volleyball men's pairs were seeded into four pools and a four-team bracket was played within each pool. Teams with two wins after this stage – i.e. the top-ranked side from each pool – advanced directly to the quarter-finals.

Teams losing their first pool match played off, and the losing sides from those games were eliminated. The playoff winners each played a crossover match against a second-placed side from another pool in a repechage to determine the remaining quarter-finalists.

Pool A

Round 1	Round 2
8 July – Match 1
(PNG)	2
9 July – Match 9
(NMI)	0
(PNG)	0
8 July – Match 2
(TUV)	2
(KIR)	1
to quarter-finals
(TUV)	2

Pool B

Round 1	Round 2
8 July – Match 3
(SAM)	2
9 July – Match 11
(TAH)	1
(SAM)	2
8 July – Match 4
(PLW)	0
(COK)	1
to quarter-finals
(PLW)	2

Pool C

Round 1	Round 2
8 July – Match 5
(TGA)	2
9 July – Match 13
(GUM)	0
(TGA)	2
8 July – Match 6
(ASM)	0
(NCL)	1
to quarter-finals
(ASM)	2

Pool D

Round 1	Round 2
8 July – Match 7
(VAN)	2
9 July – Match 15
(NRU)	0
(VAN)	0
8 July – Match 8
(AUS)	2
(SOL)	0
to quarter-finals
(AUS)	2

=== Playoffs – repechage matches ===
Round 2 elimination
9 July – Match 16: Pool D 3rd place
(SOL)	2
(NRU)	0
9 July – Match 14: Pool C 3rd place
(GUM)	2
(NCL)	0

Round 3 elimination
10 July – Match 17
(ASM)	2
(SOL)	0
10 July – Match 18
(PNG)	2
(GUM)	0

10 July – Match 19
(PLW)	1
9 July – Match 10: Pool A 3rd place
(KIR)	2
(NMI)	0
(KIR)	2
10 July – Match 20
(VAN)	1
9 July – Match 12: Pool B 3rd place
(TAH)	2
(TAH)	2
(COK)	0

=== Finals matches ===
The winners of each pool – the teams from Tuvalu, Samoa, Tonga and Australia – advanced directly to the quarter-finals. Their respective opponents in the round of eight – American Samoa, Tahiti, Kiribati, and Papua New Guinea – won through via repechage match playoffs.

The Australia pair of Tim Dickson and Marcus Ferguson won the final, overcoming an injury to Dickson during the first set to defeat Tahiti in three sets, while Tonga took out the bronze medal by defeating American Samoa, also in three sets.

Quarter-finals
11 July – Match 21: QF1
Malosa – Talake (TUV)	1
Aitui – Fagaima (ASM)	2
11 July – Match 22: QF2
Dickson – Ferguson (AUS)	2
Batari – Walo (PNG)	0
11 July – Match 23: QF3
Funaki – Fonohema (TGA)	2
Manuera – Ioakim (KIR)	1
11 July – Match 24: QF4
Stowers – Ena (SAM)	0
Ena – Paraue (TAH)	2

Semi-finals
12 July – Match 25: SF1
Dickson – Ferguson (AUS)	2
Aitui – Fagaima (ASM)	0
12 July – Match 26: SF2
Ena – Paraue (TAH)	2
Funaki – Fonohema (TGA)	0

Gold medal
12 July – Match 28: Final
Dickson – Ferguson (AUS)	2
Ena – Paraue (TAH)	1
Bronze medal
12 July – Match 27: 3rd place
Funaki – Fonohema (TGA)	2
Aitui – Fagaima (ASM)	1

== Women's tournament ==
=== Pool matches ===
Pool A

Round 1	Round 2
9 July – Match 6
(VAN)	2
8 July – Match 1
(TAH)	0
(KIR)	0
to quarter-finals to quarter-finals
(TAH)	2

Pool B

Round 1	Round 2
8 July – Match 2
(SOL)	0
10 July – Match 7: Pool B 1st place
(ASM)	2
(ASM)	2
8 July – Match 3
(AUS)	1
(NCL)	0
to quarter-finals
(AUS)	2
10 July – Match 8: Pool B 3rd place
(SOL)	2
(NCL)	0

Pool C

Round 1	Round 2
9 July – Match 4
(SAM)	0
10 July – Match 9: Pool C 1st place
(MHL)	2
(MHL)	0
9 July – Match 5
(PNG)	2
(PNG)	2
to quarter-finals to quarter-finals
(PLW)	0
10 July – Match 10: Pool C 3rd place
(SAM)	2
(PLW)	1

=== Playoffs – elimination matches ===
Round 3 elimination
10 July – Match 11
(SOL)	2
(SAM)	0
10 July – Match 12
(AUS)	2
(PLW)	0

10 July – Match 13
(NCL)	2
(KIR)	1

=== Finals ===
The Vanuatu women's team of Miller Pata (née Elwin) and Sherysyn Toko won gold, defeating the Tahiti women's pair in straight sets in the final. American Samoa defeated Solomon Islands for the bronze.

Quarter-finals
11 July – Match 17: QF4
Keil – Pula (ASM)	2
Qazing – Lawi (NCL)	0
11 July – Match 16: QF3
Pata – Toko (VAN)	2
Kendall – Weiler (AUS)	0
11 July – Match 15: QF2
Fareura – Maau (TAH)	2
Brown – Tripplett (MHL)	0
11 July – Match 14: QF1
Gwali – Donga (SOL)	2
Awadu – Bae (PNG)	0

Semi-finals
12 July – Match 19: SF2
Pata – Toko (VAN)	2
Keil – Pula (ASM)	0
12 July – Match 18: SF1
Fareura – Maau (TAH)	2
Gwali – Donga (SOL)	0

Gold medal
12 July – Match 21: Final
Pata – Toko (VAN)	2
Fareura – Maau (TAH)	0
Bronze medal
12 July – Match 20: 3rd place
Keil – Pula (ASM)	2
Gwali – Donga (SOL)	0

== See also ==
- Volleyball at the 2019 Pacific Games
- Beach volleyball at the Pacific Games
