= Mariafe Artacho del Solar =

Australian beach volleyball player

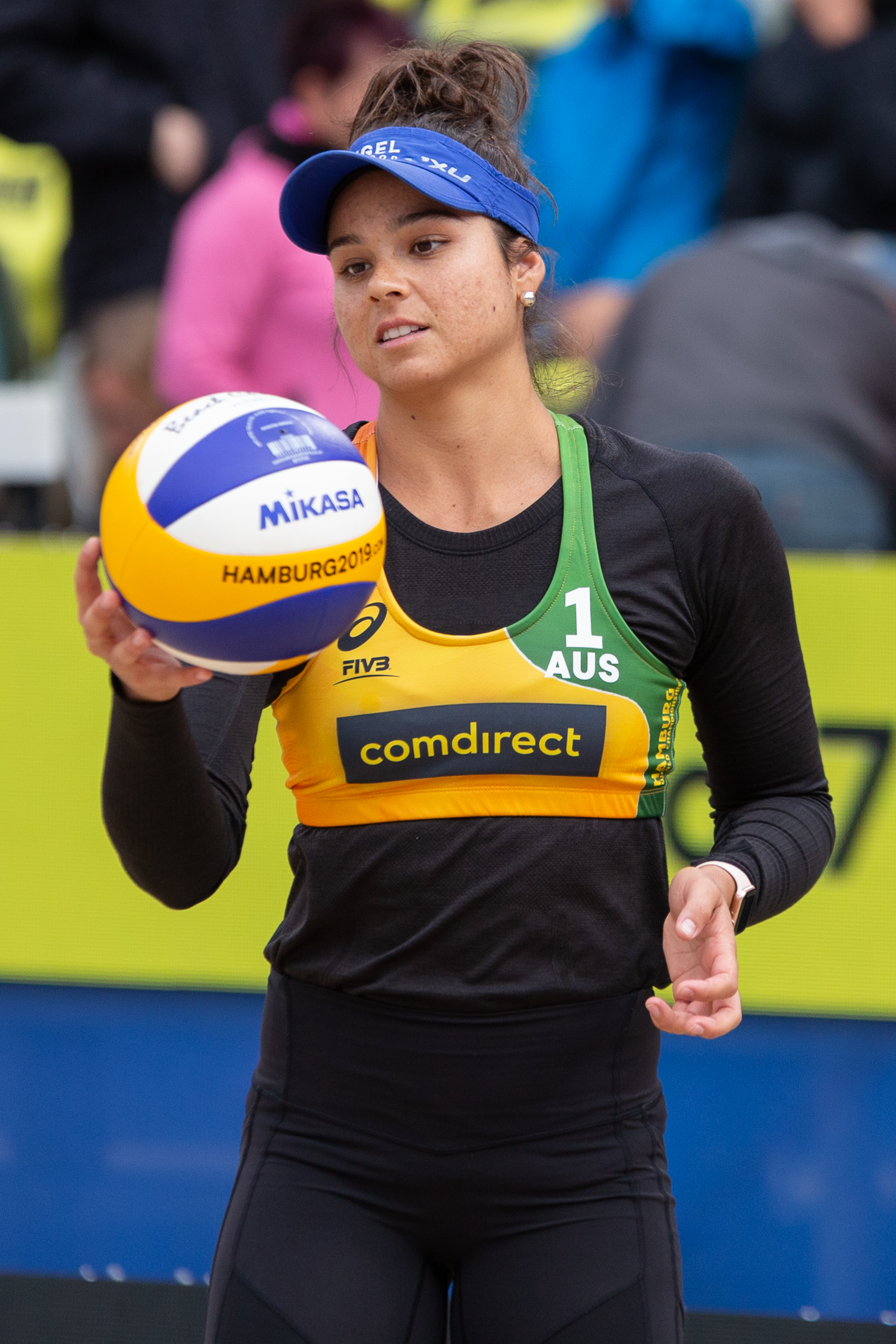
- Del Solar in 2019

Personal information
- Nationality: Australian
- Born: 24 October 1993 (age 33) Lima, Peru
- Height: 5 ft 9 in (175 cm)
- Weight: 67 kg (148 lb)
Beach volleyball information
Current teammate
- Years: Teammate
- 2017–present: Taliqua Clancy
Previous teammates
- Years: Teammate
- 2016–2017 2013–2016 2012–2013: Jessyka Ngauamo; Nicole Laird; Taliqua Clancy
Medal record
Women's beach volleyball
Representing Australia
Olympic Games
Silver medal – second place	2020 Tokyo	Beach
World Championships
Bronze medal – third place	2019 Hamburg	Beach
Commonwealth Games
Silver medal – second place	2022 Birmingham	Beach
Silver medal – second place	2018 Gold Coast	Beach
World Tour Finals
Bronze medal – third place	2018	World Tour Finals
Volleyball World Beach Pro Tour
Silver medal – second place	2023	Uberlândia Elite 16
Bronze medal – third place	2023	Tepic Elite 16
Bronze medal – third place	2023	Doha Elite 16
Bronze medal – third place	2022	Torquay Elite 16
Bronze medal – third place	2022	Gstaad Elite 16
Gold medal – first place	2022	Espinho Challenge
Silver medal – second place	2022	Kuşadası Challenge
FIVB Beach Volleyball World Tour
Gold medal – first place	2021	Cancún 3
Gold medal – first place	2020	Chetumal Open
Gold medal – first place	2019	Warsaw Open
Gold medal – first place	2018	Espinho Open
Gold medal – first place	2018	Lucerne Open
Gold medal – first place	2018	Sydney Open
Gold medal – first place	2018	Qinzhou Open
Silver medal – second place	2019	Jinjiang Open
Silver medal – second place	2017	Sydney Open
Bronze medal – third place	2019	Xiamen Open
Bronze medal – third place	2018	Xiamen Open
Asian Beach Volleyball Championships
Gold medal – first place	2019	Maoming
Gold medal – first place	2018	Satun
Silver medal – second place	2022	Roi Et
Silver medal – second place	2016	Sydney
Bronze medal – third place	2015	Hong Kong

Mariafe Artacho del Solar (born 24 October 1993) is an Australian beach volleyball player. She represented Australia at the 2016 Summer Olympics in Rio de Janeiro and the 2020 Summer Olympics in Tokyo in 2021. Artacho del Solar plays as a right-side defender. As of 21 January 2020, she and partner Taliqua Clancy were ranked 5th according to the Women's FIVB World Rankings.

== Early life ==
Del Solar moved with her mother from Lima, Peru to Sydney when she was 11 years old. They joined her older brother and extended family who already lived there. She spoke limited English and found that sport was the best way to communicate. She attended Gordon West Public School before attending Killara High School, where she met her future Rio Olympics beach volleyball partner Nicole Laird.

Del Solar was then offered an AIS Scholarship with the beach volleyball program in 2012, which led her to move to Adelaide, South Australia, where the Australian Beach Volleyball Program is located.

== Professional career ==
=== Rio de Janeiro – 2016 Olympics ===
Del Solar made her Olympic debut at the 2016 Summer Olympics in Rio de Janeiro with then-partner Nicole Laird. The pair did not win a match in Rio, losing to the US, Switzerland, and China in their preliminary pool matches, finishing the tournament in 19th place.

=== Gold Coast – 2018 Commonwealth Games ===
Del Solar participated in the 2018 Commonwealth Games on the Gold Coast with partner Taliqua Clancy. The duo won their three preliminary pool matches without losing a set, with wins over Cyprus' Manolina Konstantinou and Mariota Angelopoulou (21–14, 21–9), Grenada's Renisha Stafford and Thornia Williams (21–2, 21–11), and Scotland's Lynne Beattie and Melissa Coutts (21–9, 21–9). Finishing top of their pool, they advanced to the quarter-finals, where they defeated Rwanda's Charlotte Nzayisenga and Denyse Mutatsimpundu (21–9, 21–8) to advance to the semi-finals. After winning the opening set of their semi-final against Vanuatu's pairing of Linline Matauatu and Miller Pata, the duo lost their first set of the tournament, sending the match to the decider, which they won to advance to the gold medal match (21–19, 16–21, 15–9). At the gold medal match, the duo lost to Canada's Melissa Humana-Paredes and Sarah Pavan (19–21, 20–22) to take home the silver medal.

=== FIVB World Tour 2019 ===
Del Solar and Clancy are currently competing on the FIVB World Tour. The pair have already won a Bronze in Xiamen, China and Gold in the Asian Beach Volleyball Championships at Maoming. They competed at the 2019 Beach Volleyball World Championships in Hamburg, Germany, from 28 June to 7 July, winning bronze. Due to an injury to Del Solar's left knee, the pair took three months off before competing again towards the end of 2019, during which they won gold at the 4-star double gender event in Chetumal, Mexico.

=== Tokyo – 2020 Olympics ===
On August 4, 2021, Del Solar and partner Taliqua Clancy upset the world number-one team of Canada in the quarter-finals. On August 5, 2021, they defeated the Latvian team with a convincing straight-sets win to advance to the gold-medal match against the United States. They lost to the U.S. in the finals, and took the silver medal.

=== Coaching ===
From August to October 2021, Del Solar coached Year 10 high-school volleyball at Ormiston College in Brisbane, Australia.

== Personal life ==
Del Solar is married to Jack Curtin; their wedding took place at a registry in November 2020.
