= Taliqua Clancy =

Australian beach volleyball player

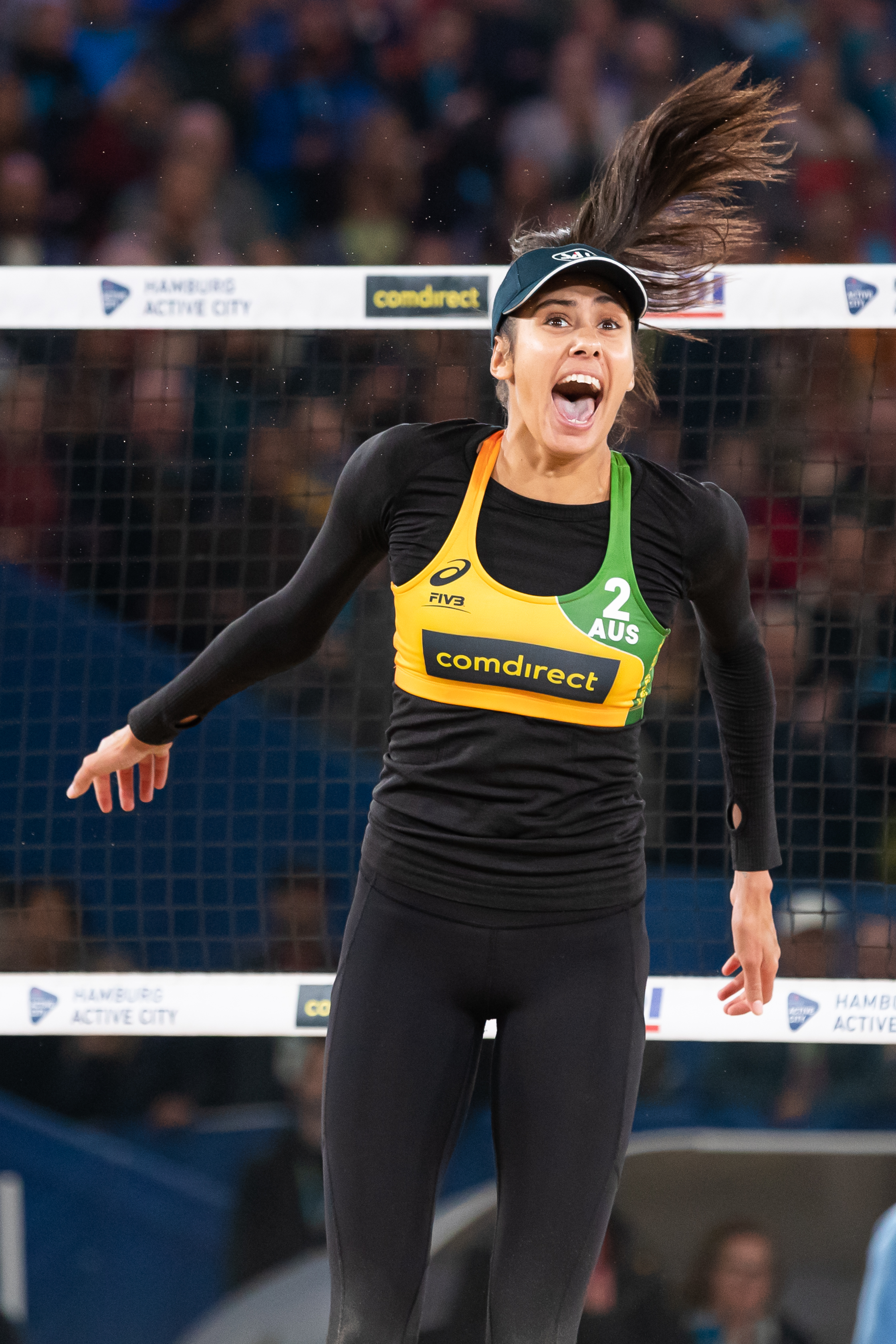
- Clancy in 2019

Personal information
- Nationality: Australian
- Born: 25 June 1992 (age 34) Kingaroy, Queensland, Australia
- Height: 1.89 m (6 ft 2 in)
- Weight: 64 kg (141 lb)
Beach volleyball information
Current teammate
- Years: Teammate
- 2026–present: Stefanie Fejes
Previous teammates
- Years: Teammate
- 2025–2026 2024 2017–2024 2013–2017 2012–2013 2010–2012 2009: Jana Milutinovic; Georgia Johnson; Mariafe Artacho del Solar; Louise Bawden; Mariafe Artacho del Solar; Eliza Hynes; Katie Bartoli
Honours
Women's beach volleyball
Representing Australia
Olympic Games
Silver medal – second place	2020 Tokyo	Beach
World Championships
Bronze medal – third place	2019 Hamburg	Beach
Commonwealth Games
Silver medal – second place	2022 Birmingham	Beach
Silver medal – second place	2018 Gold Coast	Beach
World Tour Finals
Bronze medal – third place	2018	World Tour Finals
Volleyball World Beach Pro Tour
Gold medal – first place	2022	Espinho Challenge
Silver medal – second place	2023	Uberlândia Elite 16
Silver medal – second place	2022	Kuşadası Challenge
Bronze medal – third place	2023	Tepic Elite 16
Bronze medal – third place	2023	Doha Elite 16
Bronze medal – third place	2022	Torquay Elite 16
Bronze medal – third place	2022	Gstaad Elite 16
FIVB Beach Volleyball World Tour
Gold medal – first place	2021	Cancún 3
Gold medal – first place	2020	Chetumal Open
Gold medal – first place	2019	Warsaw Open
Gold medal – first place	2018	Espinho Open
Gold medal – first place	2018	Lucerne Open
Gold medal – first place	2018	Sydney Open
Gold medal – first place	2018	Qinzhou Open
Silver medal – second place	2019	Jinjiang Open
Bronze medal – third place	2019	Xiamen Open
Bronze medal – third place	2018	Xiamen Open
Bronze medal – third place	2015	Porec Major
Asian Beach Volleyball Championships
Gold medal – first place	2026	Shangluo
Gold medal – first place	2019	Maoming
Gold medal – first place	2018	Satun
Gold medal – first place	2017	Songkhla
Gold medal – first place	2015	Hong Kong
Gold medal – first place	2014	Jinjiang
Silver medal – second place	2022	Roi Et

Taliqua Clancy (born 25 June 1992) is an Australian volleyball and beach volleyball player who represented Australia at the 2016 Summer Olympics in beach volleyball, partnered with Louise Bawden. She is the first Indigenous Australian volleyball player to represent Australia at the Olympics. Clancy plays as a left-side blocker.

== Early life ==
Clancy was born in Kingaroy, Queensland, into a family of Indigenous Australian descent (Wulli Wulli and Goreng Goreng). She spent the first 15 years of her life in Kingaroy. She turned down a netball scholarship offer from the Australian Institute of Sport and instead accepted a scholarship to the Queensland Academy of Sport for beach volleyball. When Clancy was 17, she accepted an Australian Institute of Sport scholarship and relocated to Adelaide to participate in the national beach volleyball program. In 2019, she returned to her home state of Queensland and is now based in Brisbane.

== Professional career ==
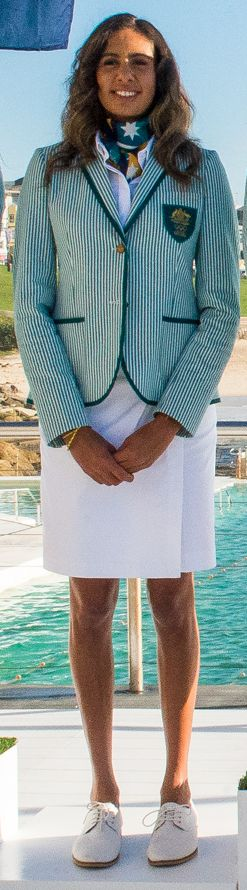
Clancy in 2016

=== Rio de Janeiro – 2016 Olympics ===
She participated in the 2016 Summer Olympics in Rio with partner Louise Bawden, reaching the quarter-finals.

=== Gold Coast – 2018 Commonwealth Games ===
Clancy participated in the 2018 Commonwealth Games on the Gold Coast with partner Mariafe Artacho del Solar. The Australian pairing won their 3 preliminary pool matches without losing a set, with wins over Cyprus's Manolina Konstantinou and Mariota Angelopoulou (21–14, 21–9), Grenada's Renisha Stafford and Thornia Williams (21–2, 21–11), and Scotland's Lynne Beattie and Melissa Coutts (21–9, 21–9). Finishing top of their pool they advanced to the quarter-finals, where they easily dispatched Rwanda's Charlotte Nzayisenga and Denyse Mutatsimpundu (21–9, 21–8) to advance to the semi-finals. After winning the opening set of their semi-final against Vanuatu's pairing of Linline Matauatu and Miller Pata, the Aussie duo lost their first set of the tournament to send the match to the decider, which they won convincingly to advance to the gold medal match (21–19, 16–21, 15–9). In the match of the tournament, the Australian team came up agonisingly short against their more experienced and higher ranked Canadian opponents, Melissa Humana-Paredes and Sarah Pavan (19–21, 20–22). Although their winning run came to an end, they secured a silver medal at their first Commonwealth Games together.

=== Hamburg – 2019 World Championships ===
Taliqua participated in the 2019 World Championships in Hamburg with partner Mariafe Artacho del Solar. The Australian pairing comfortably won their first preliminary match against Mauritius' Maita Cousin and Letendrie Nathalie (21–5, 21–6) before being defeated by the Dutch pair of Joy Stubbe and Marleen van Iersel (19–21, 22–24). In a must win match, the Australians prevailed by the slimmest of margins over the American duo of Brooke Sweat and Kerri Walsh Jennings (21–19, 24–22) to advance to the elimination rounds. It was during their first elimination match that Mariafe suffered an injury to her Medial Collateral Ligament in her left knee, despite this injury, they defeated Canada's Heather Bansley and Brandie Wilkerson (21–15, 21–19). Due to the injury, the Aussie pairing were unsure if they could continue with their round of 16 match against Switzerland's Joana Heidrich and Anouk Vergé-Dépré the following day. Nevertheless, the duo played on and won a tight 3 set match against the Swiss (21–16, 21–23, 15–9).

Advancing to their first World Championships quarterfinal they were one win away from a top four finish. With no other teams being fully aware of the injury, the pair continued on with a quarterfinal against their Russian opponents Nadezda Makroguzova and Svetlana Kholomina eventually winning that set and closing out the match in the second (24–22, 21–14). They were defeated in their semifinal by the American pairing of Alix Klineman and April Ross (15–21, 18–21). They went on to win their bronze medal play-off against the Swiss team of Nina Betschart and Tanja Hüberli (21–18, 22–20).

=== Tokyo – 2020 Olympics ===
On 4 August 2021, Clancy and partner Mariafe Artacho del Solar upset the world number-one team of Canada in the quarter-finals. On 5 August, they defeated the Latvian team with a straight-sets win to advance to the gold-medal match against the United States, which they subsequently lost to earn the silver medal.

=== International Competitions ===
Year	Competition	Venue	Position	Notes
2013	2013 Beach Volleyball World Championships	Stare Jabłonki, Poland	17th	Beach
2015	2015 Beach Volleyball World Championships	The Hague - Amsterdam - Apeldoorn - Rotterdam, Netherlands	5th	Beach
2016	Olympic Games	Rio de Janeiro, Brazil	5th	Beach
2016	World Tour Finals	Toronto, Canada	5th	Beach
2017	2017 Beach Volleyball World Championships	Vienna, Austria	17th	Beach
2018	Commonwealth Games	Gold Coast, Queensland	2nd	Beach
2018	World Tour Finals	Hamburg, Germany	3rd	Beach
2019	2019 Beach Volleyball World Championships	Hamburg, Germany	3rd	Beach
2021	Olympic Games	Tokyo, Japan	2nd	Beach
2022	2022 Beach Volleyball World Championships	Rome, Italy	5th	Beach
2022	Commonwealth Games	Birmingham, England	2nd	Beach
2022	World Beach Pro Tour Finals	Doha, Qatar	4th	Beach
2023	2023 Beach Volleyball World Championships	Tlaxcala - Apizaco - Huamantla, Mexico	4th	Beach
2023	World Beach Pro Tour Finals	Doha, Qatar	4th	Beach
2024	Olympic Games	Paris, France	4th	Beach
2025	2025 Beach Volleyball World Championships	Adelaide, Australia	37th	Beach
