= Beach volleyball at the 2017 Pacific Mini Games =

Beach volleyball at the 2017 Pacific Mini Games in Port Vila, Vanuatu is held at the Korman beach volleyball courts from the 11–15 December.

== Nations participating ==
Fourteen nations will participate in beach volleyball at the 2017 games.

== Medal summary ==
=== Medal table ===
Host nation

Rank	Nation	Gold	Silver	Bronze	Total
1	Papua New Guinea (PNG)	1	0	0	1
1	Vanuatu (VAN)	1	0	0	1
3	Samoa (SAM)	0	1	0	1
3	Solomon Islands (SOL)	0	1	0	1
5	Fiji (FIJ)	0	0	2	2
Totals (5 entries)		2	2	2	6

=== Medalists ===
Event	Gold	Silver	Bronze
Men	Papua New Guinea (PNG); Mea; Kilarupa	Samoa (SAM); Tui; Lesoa	Fiji (FIJ); Elliot; Korowale
Women	Vanuatu (VAN); Joe; Matauatu	Solomon Islands (SOL); Gwali; UUna	Fiji (FIJ); Nima; Ratudina

== Men's tournament ==
=== Preliminary round ===
Twelve teams consisting of three pools of four will be competing for six spots in the knockout stage. According to statistics from the preliminary stage, the top two teams will advance directly into the semis with the remaining four teams playing for the remaining two semifinal spots.

==== Pool A ====
Pos	Team	Pld	W	L	Pts	SW	SL	SR	SPW	SPL	SPR	Qualification
1	Papua New Guinea	1	1	0	3	2	0	MAX	42	17	2.471	Knockout stage
2	Solomon Islands	1	1	0	3	2	0	MAX	42	25	1.680	Knockout stage
3	Cook Islands	1	0	1	0	0	2	0.000	25	42	0.595	
4	Palau	1	0	1	0	0	2	0.000	17	42	0.405	

Date	Time		Score		Set 1	Set 2	Set 3	Set 4	Set 5	Total	Report
11 Dec		Solomon Islands	2–0	Cook Islands	21–7	21–18				42–25	
11 Dec		Papua New Guinea	2–0	Palau	21–10	21–7				42–17	
12 Dec		Papua New Guinea	2–0	Cook Islands	21–3	21–10	0–0			42–13	
12 Dec		Solomon Islands	2–0	Palau	21–14	21–5	0–0			42–19	
12 Dec		Papua New Guinea	0–0	Solomon Islands	0–0	0–0	0–0			0–0	
12 Dec		Cook Islands	0–0	Palau	0–0	0–0	0–0			0–0	

==== Pool B ====
Pos	Team	Pld	W	L	Pts	SW	SL	SR	SPW	SPL	SPR	Qualification
1	Fiji	1	1	0	3	2	1	2.000	57	54	1.056	Knockout stage
2	Kiribati	1	1	0	3	2	0	MAX	42	33	1.273	Knockout stage
3	Samoa	1	0	1	0	1	2	0.500	54	57	0.947	
4	New Caledonia	1	0	1	0	0	2	0.000	33	42	0.786	

Date	Time		Score		Set 1	Set 2	Set 3	Set 4	Set 5	Total	Report
11 Dec		Kiribati	2–0	New Caledonia	21–16	21–17				42–33	
11 Dec		Fiji	2–1	Samoa	21–23	21–18	15–13			57–54	
12 Dec		Fiji	0–0	New Caledonia	0–0	0–0	0–0			0–0	
12 Dec		Kiribati	0–0	Samoa	0–0	0–0	0–0			0–0	
12 Dec		Fiji	0–0	Kiribati	0–0	0–0	0–0			0–0	
12 Dec		New Caledonia	0–0	Samoa	0–0	0–0	0–0			0–0	

==== Pool C ====
Pos	Team	Pld	W	L	Pts	SW	SL	SR	SPW	SPL	SPR	Qualification
1	Vanuatu	1	1	0	3	2	0	MAX	42	34	1.235	Knockout stage
2	Wallis and Futuna	1	1	0	3	2	1	2.000	59	56	1.054	Knockout stage
3	Tuvalu	1	0	1	0	1	2	0.500	56	59	0.949	
4	Tonga	1	0	1	0	0	2	0.000	34	42	0.810	

Date	Time		Score		Set 1	Set 2	Set 3	Set 4	Set 5	Total	Report
11 Dec		Tuvalu	1–2	Wallis and Futuna	22–20	22–24	12–15			56–59	
11 Dec		Vanuatu	2–0	Tonga	21–18	21–16				42–34	
12 Dec		Vanuatu	0–0	Wallis and Futuna	0–0	0–0	0–0			0–0	
12 Dec		Tuvalu	0–0	Tonga	0–0	0–0	0–0			0–0	
12 Dec		Vanuatu	0–0	Tuvalu	0–0	0–0	0–0			0–0	
12 Dec		Wallis and Futuna	0–0	Tonga	0–0	0–0	0–0			0–0	

== Women's tournament ==
=== Preliminary round ===
Nine teams divided into two pools, pool A with five teams and pool B with four, will be competing against each other with the top two in each pool advancing to the semifinals.

==== Pool A ====
Pos	Team	Pld	W	L	Pts	SW	SL	SR	SPW	SPL	SPR	Qualification
1	Vanuatu	1	1	0	3	2	0	MAX	42	16	2.625	Semi-finals
2	Solomon Islands	1	1	0	3	2	0	MAX	42	19	2.211	Semi-finals
3	Wallis and Futuna	1	0	1	0	0	2	0.000	19	42	0.452	
4	New Caledonia	1	0	1	0	0	2	0.000	16	42	0.381	
5	Tuvalu	0	0	0	0	0	0	—	0	0	—	

Date	Time		Score		Set 1	Set 2	Set 3	Set 4	Set 5	Total	Report
11 Dec		Solomon Islands	2–0	Wallis and Futuna	21–12	21–7				42–19	
11 Dec		Vanuatu	2–0	New Caledonia	21–10	21–6				42–16	
12 Dec		Solomon Islands	0–0	Tuvalu	0–0	0–0	0–0			0–0	
12 Dec		Vanuatu	0–0	Wallis and Futuna	0–0	0–0	0–0			0–0	
12 Dec		New Caledonia	0–0	Tuvalu	0–0	0–0	0–0			0–0	
12 Dec		Vanuatu	0–0	Solomon Islands	0–0	0–0	0–0			0–0	
12 Dec		Vanuatu	0–0	Tuvalu	0–0	0–0	0–0			0–0	
12 Dec		New Caledonia	0–0	Wallis and Futuna	0–0	0–0	0–0			0–0	
13 Dec		Tuvalu	0–0	Wallis and Futuna	0–0	0–0	0–0			0–0	
13 Dec		Solomon Islands	0–0	New Caledonia	0–0	0–0	0–0			0–0	

==== Pool B ====
Pos	Team	Pld	W	L	Pts	SW	SL	SR	SPW	SPL	SPR	Qualification
1	Fiji	1	1	0	3	2	0	MAX	42	23	1.826	Semi-finals
2	Papua New Guinea	1	1	0	3	2	0	MAX	42	30	1.400	Semi-finals
3	Kiribati	1	0	1	0	0	2	0.000	30	42	0.714	
4	Guam	1	0	1	0	0	2	0.000	23	42	0.548	

Date	Time		Score		Set 1	Set 2	Set 3	Set 4	Set 5	Total	Report
11 Dec		Papua New Guinea	2–0	Kiribati	21–17	21–13				42–30	
11 Dec		Fiji	2–0	Guam	21–8	21–15				42–23	
12 Dec		Papua New Guinea	0–0	Guam	0–0	0–0	0–0			0–0	
12 Dec		Fiji	0–0	Kiribati	0–0	0–0	0–0			0–0	
12 Dec		Kiribati	0–0	Guam	0–0	0–0	0–0			0–0	
12 Dec		Fiji	0–0	Papua New Guinea	0–0	0–0	0–0			0–0	

== See also ==
- Beach volleyball at the Pacific Games
