= Abby Blackman =

Trinidad and Tobago volleyball player (born 1984)

Personal information
- Nationality: Trinidad and Tobago
- Born: 15 June 1984 (age 42)
- Height: 183 cm (72 in)
- Weight: 65 kg (143 lb)
- Spike: 304 cm (120 in)
- Block: 293 cm (115 in)

Volleyball information
- Number: 15 (national team)

National team
2011	Trinidad and Tobago

Abby Blackman (born 15 June 1984) is a Trinidad and Tobago female volleyball player. She was part of the Trinidad and Tobago women's national volleyball team.

She participated at the 2011 Women's Pan-American Volleyball Cup.
