= Melissa Humana-Paredes =

Canadian beach volleyball player

Melissa Humaña-Paredes
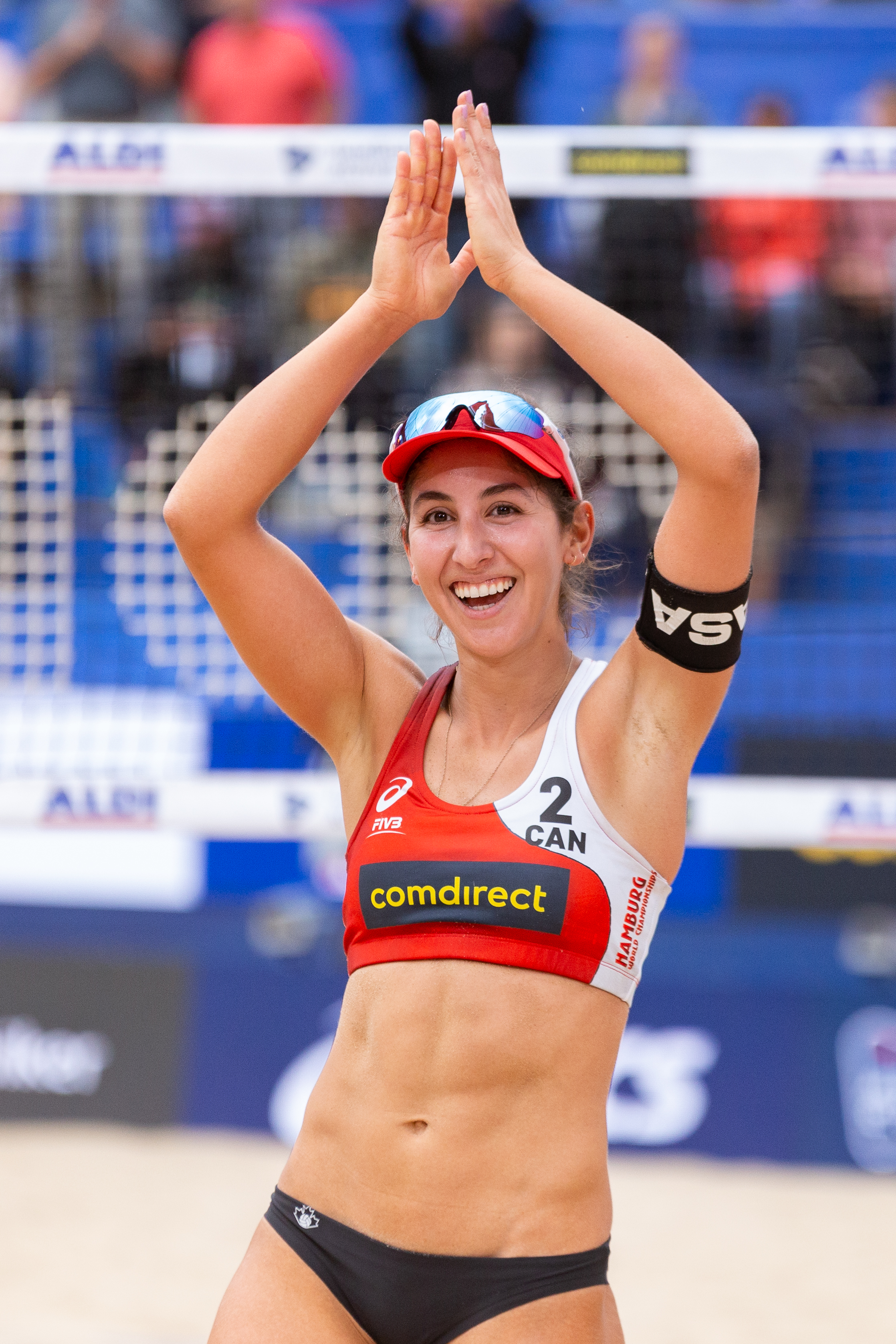
- Humaña-Paredes at 2019 Beach Volleyball World Championships

Personal information
- Full name: Melissa Humaña-Paredes
- Born: October 10, 1992 (age 34). Toronto, Ontario, Canada
- Hometown: Toronto, Ontario, Canada
- Height: 1.75 m (5 ft 9 in)
- Education: York University

Beach volleyball information

Current teammate
Years	Teammate
2022–	Brandie Wilkerson

Previous teammates
Years	Teammate
2016–2022; 2012–2016	Sarah Pavan; Taylor Pischke
Honours
Representing Canada
Olympic Games
Silver medal – second place	2024 Paris	Beach
World Championships
Gold medal – first place	2019 Hamburg	Beach
Commonwealth Games
Gold medal – first place	2018 Gold Coast	Beach
Gold medal – first place	2022 Birmingham	Beach
Pan American Games
Silver medal – second place	2023 Santiago	Beach
U21 World Championships
Silver medal – second place	2011 Halifax	Beach

Melissa Humaña-Paredes (born October 10, 1992) is a Canadian beach volleyball player currently partnered with Brandie Wilkerson. The pair represented Canada at the 2024 Summer Olympics, winning a silver medal.

Humaña-Paredes previously competed with Sarah Pavan, notably winning a gold medal at the 2019 Beach Volleyball World Championships and two Commonwealth Games titles and competing at the 2020 Summer Olympics.

== Early life ==
Born in Toronto, Ontario, Humana-Paredes is the younger daughter of two Chilean political refugees, ballet dancer Myriam Paredes and volleyball player Hernán Humaña, who was part of the national team and later coached Canadians John Child and Mark Heese to the bronze medal at the 1996 Olympics. Humaña-Paredes started playing beach volleyball at the age of 12, and four years later, was already representing Canada internationally. She also played competitive indoor volleyball for Storm Volleyball. She attended Humberside Collegiate Institute in Toronto. She then attended York University, majoring in communications while playing CIS volleyball for the York Lions for four seasons from 2010 to 2014.

== Volleyball career ==
=== Early years ===
In 2011, Humaña-Paredes won a silver medal at the FIVB Beach Volleyball U21 World Championships with Victoria Altomare. Years later, as Hernan talked with volleyball coach Garth Pischke, he learned his daughter Taylor wanted to join the beach volleyball scene and suggested that the two daughters be joined as a team. Both were trained by John Child. The new pair led Humaña-Paredes to win the bronze medal at the World Under-23 Championships and be named the top female rookie in 2015 by the International Federation of Volleyball.

Humaña-Paredes competed at several Grand Slam and World Cup events, reaching the round of 16 at the 2015 Beach Volleyball World Championships and the semi-finals at the 2015 Pan American Games. From August 23–28, 2016, she competed with Pischke at the Long Beach, California, Grand Slam. Playing in Pool-A, they lost to Maria Antonelli and Lili of Brazil (21–11, 23–21), and April Ross and Kerri Walsh Jennings of the United States (21–16, 21–17) in straight sets. Playing against Carol and Ana Patrícia of Brazil, they won in straight sets (21–19, 26–24), placing them in 3rd in Pool-A.

=== Partnership with Pavan (2016–22) ===
After forming her partnership with Sarah Pavan, the two were named to the Canadian team for the 2018 Commonwealth Games, the first edition of the championships to feature a beach volleyball tournament. Humaña-Paredes/Pavan reached the gold medal match, where they defeated Australians Clancy/Artacho del Solar for the title.

Humaña-Paredes and Pavan won the gold medal at the 2019 Beach Volleyball World Championships, defeating the American team of April Ross and Alix Klineman in straight-sets 2-0 (23-21, 23-21) for Canada's first medal ever at the event. This victory automatically qualified the Canadian pair for the 2020 Summer Olympics in Tokyo. They achieved further success on the FIVB tour that summer with additional tournament wins at the Edmonton Open in late July, and at the Vienna Major in early August. These FIVB tour wins were followed by success on the AVP tour, with additional championship wins over Ross and Klineman at both the Manhattan Beach Open in mid-August and the Hawaii Open in late September.

Humaña-Paredes and Pavan were named to the Canadian Olympic team for the 2020 Summer Olympics, which the COVID-19 pandemic caused to be delayed until 2021. The two went undefeated during pool play, winning every set. Entering the knockout rounds as the top seed, they defeated Spaniards Liliana/Baquerizo in the Round of 16. In the quarterfinal, a rematch of the Commonwealth Games final with Australians Clancy/Artacho del Solar, they lost two sets to one and were eliminated from the tournament.

In what would prove to be their final competition together, Humaña-Paredes/Pavan were for a second time part of Canada's Commonwealth Games team, this time for the 2022 edition in Birmingham. They reached the tournament final for a second consecutive time, once again competing against Clancy/Artacho del Solar. In a three-set match, they defeated the Australians to successfully defend their title. At the end of the same month, they announced the end of their partnership, saying they had "decided it is time to explore new options in our athletic careers separately."

=== Partnership with Wilkerson (2022–present) ===
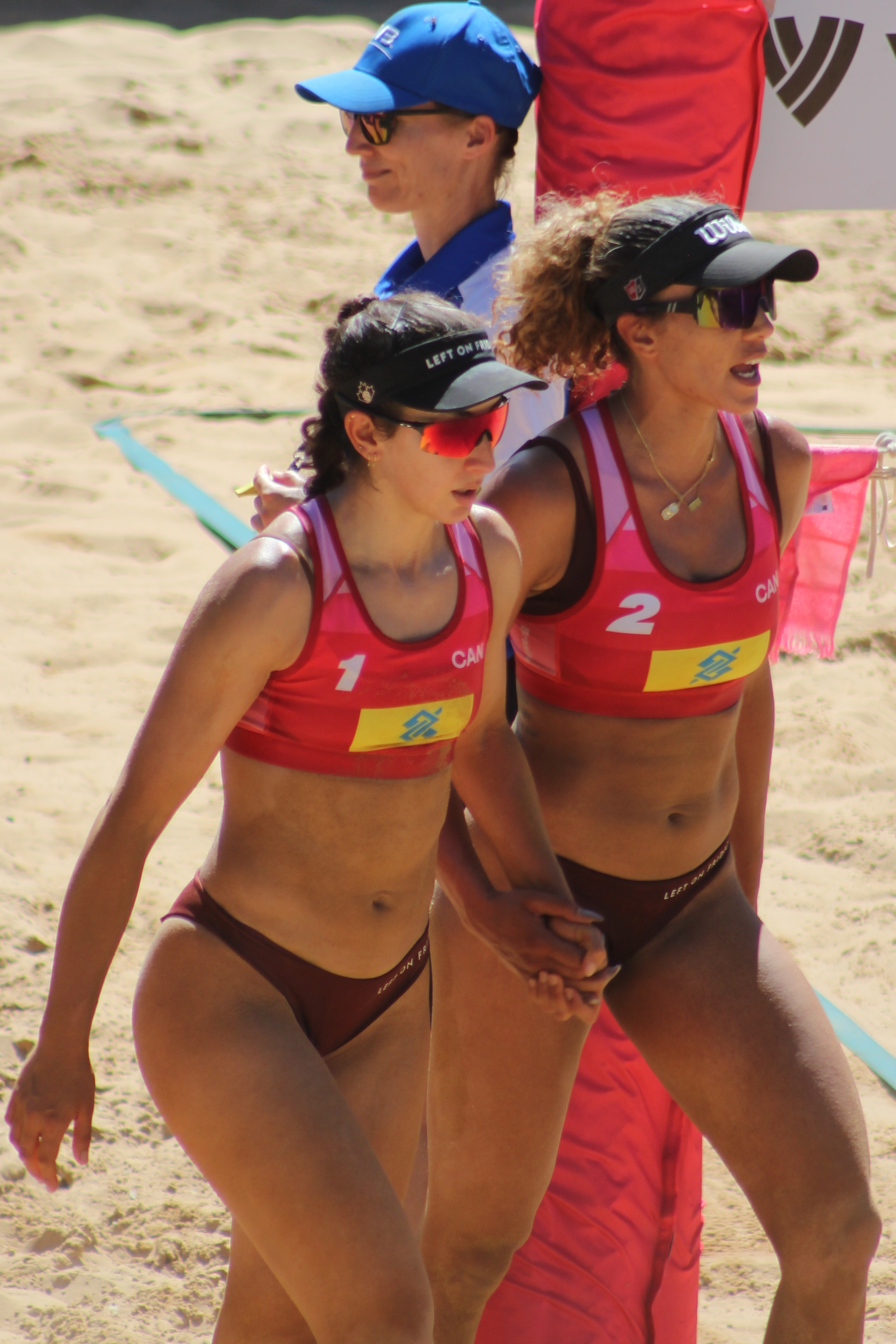
Humana-Paredes and Brandie Wilkerson in 2024.

After competing together and achieving a second-place finish at the 2022 AVP Chicago Open, on November 1, 2022, Humaña-Paredes formally announced that she had formed a new partnership with Brandie Wilkerson, a former teammate during her time playing indoor volleyball at York University. She explained: "I think since our university days we both envisioned playing together at some point in our careers - we just weren't sure when that would happen. This time just seems right in both our personal and athletic lives." Playing together The new team enjoyed immediate success, appearing in ten tournaments in 2023 with no placement lower than fifth. At the 2023 Beach Volleyball World Championships in early October, the duo won five consecutive matches without conceding a set, but were eliminated in the quarter-final by Clancy/Artacho del Solar. They then joined Canada's Pan American Games delegation for the 2023 edition in Santiago. Despite its proximity to the world championship, Humaña-Paredes cited her Chilean heritage as a reason to attend, never having competed in Chile previously. They served as Canada's co-flagbearers in the opening ceremony, and reached the tournament final, losing to Brazil's Ramos/Lisboa.

In June 2024, Humaña-Paredes and Wilkerson were officially named to the Canadian team for the 2024 Summer Olympics in Paris. Of this she said: "When we got together, our goals were clear: making history in Paris." The Olympic tournament began poorly for the team, who lost their first two games in pool play, and reached the knockout stage only via winning a lucky loser playoff against Czechs Hermannová/Štochlová. Humaña-Paredes/Wilkerson then managed an upset victory over Nuss/Kloth of the United States in the round of 16, winning two sets to zero, before managing the same against Spaniards Álvarez Mendoza/Moreno in the quarter-final. They became the first Canadian team to reach the semi-finals of an Olympic women's volleyball tournament. Facing the Swiss team Hüberli/Betschart, who had to that point not lost a single set in the tournament, Humaña-Paredes/Wilkerson were on the verge of elimination at the end of the second set, but successfully forced a tiebreaker round and won, qualifying for the championship match against Ramos/Lisboa. The championship match went to three sets, a first in Olympic women's beach volleyball, before the Brazilians prevailed. Humaña-Paredes and Wilkerson took the silver medal. Humana-Parades' father Hernán said that he felt their victory would have an "even bigger" impact on the sport in Canada than the bronze medal team he had coached in 1996.

== Accolades ==
- Champion, 2019 FIVB Beach Volleyball World Championships - Hamburg (representing Canada, with Sarah Pavan)
- Champion, 2019 FIVB Beach Volleyball World Tour Winner (representing Canada, with Sarah Pavan)
- FIVB Team of the Year 2019 (with Sarah Pavan)
- FIVB Best Defensive Player, 2019
- FIVB Best Setter, 2018 & 2019
- AVP Best Defensive Player, 2019
- AVP Newcomer of the Year, 2019
- FIVB Most Improved Player, 2017
- FIVB Top Rookie, 2014

=== University ===
- 2012-13 OUA First-Team All-star
- 2011-12 OUA First-Team All-star
- 2011-12 CIS Second Team All-Canadian
- 2012 York Lions Female Athlete of the Year

Sporting positions
Preceded by Larissa França and Talita Antunes (BRA)	Women's FIVB Beach World Tour Winner alongside (Canada) Sarah Pavan; 2019	Succeeded by Ágatha Bednarczuk and Eduarda Lisboa (BRA)
Preceded by Laura Ludwig and Kira Walkenhorst (GER)	FIVB Beach Volleyball World Champions alongside (Canada) Sarah Pavan; 2019	Succeeded by Eduarda Santos Lisboa and Ana Patrícia Ramos (BRA)
Awards
Preceded by Heather Bansley (CAN)	Women's FIVB World Tour "Best Defensive Player"; 2019	Succeeded by Discontinued
Preceded by Larissa França (BRA)	Women's FIVB World Tour "Best Setter"; 2019	Succeeded by Discontinued
Preceded by Sara Hughes	Women's AVP Tour "Best Defensive Player"; 2019	Succeeded by Discontinued
Preceded by Maria Clara Salgado	Women's AVP Tour "Newcomer of the Year"; 2019	Succeeded by Discontinued
Preceded by Joana Heidrich (SUI)	Women's FIVB World Tour "Most Improved Player"; 2017	Succeeded by Mariafe Artacho del Solar (AUS)
Preceded by Kira Walkenhorst (GER)	Women's FIVB World Tour "Top Rookie"; 2014	Succeeded by Taru Lahti (FIN)
