= Linline Matauatu =

Vanuatuan beach volleyball player

Personal information
- Nationality: Vanuatuan
- Born: March 23, 1991 (age 35)

Sport
- Country: Vanuatu
- Sport: Beach volleyball
Medal record
Commonwealth Games
Bronze medal – third place	2018 Gold Coast	women's tournament
Pacific Games
Gold medal – first place	2011 Noumea	women's tournament
Pacific Mini Games
Gold medal – first place	2013 Mata-Utu	women's tournament
Gold medal – first place	2017 Port Vila	women's tournament

Linline Matauatu (born 23 March 1991) is a Vanuatuan beach volleyball player.

Matauatu competed at the 2018 Commonwealth Games where she won a bronze medal in the women's tournament alongside Miller Pata.

She was named as the most improved player at the 2015 FIVB World Tour.
