= Lynne Beattie =

Scottish volleyball player (born 1985)

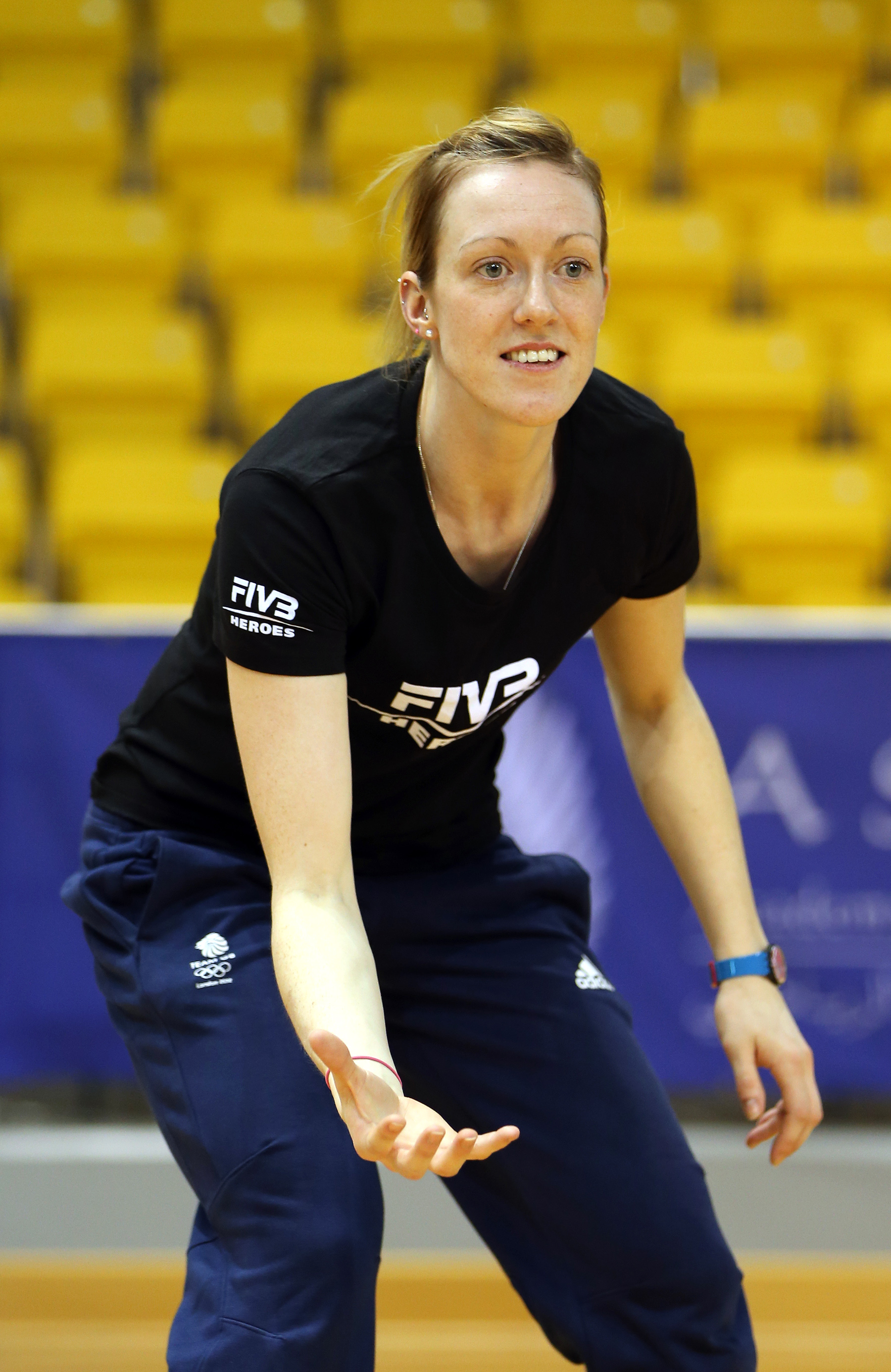
Lynne Beattie in 2013

Lynne Beattie (born 23 December 1985) is a Scottish volleyball player. She captained the Team GB volleyball squad at the London 2012 Summer Olympics, and competed for Team Scotland alongside Mel Coutts in the inaugural women's beach volleyball tournament at the 2018 Commonwealth Games.

Lynne has also taken place as a contestant on the British version of Deal or No Deal, amassing £11,000 on Thursday, 17 April 2014.

Since July 2014, Lynne has been employed by the Scottish Volleyball Association as a Regional Development Officer.
