= Manolina Konstantinou =

Cypriot volleyball player

Personal information
- Nationality: Cyprus
- Born: April 10, 1993 (age 33); Limassol, Cyprus
- Height: 1.83 m (6 ft 0 in)
- Weight: 70 kg (150 lb)
- Spike: 300 cm (120 in)
- Block: 291 cm (115 in)

Volleyball information
- Position: Outside hitter
- Current club: Olympiacos SF Piraeus

Career
Years	Teams
2002–2011; 2011–2012; 2012–2016; 2016–2018; 2018; 2018–2020; 2020–2021; 2021–2022; 2022–2024; 2024–2026; 2026–	(Cyprus) AEL Limassol (Greece) Panathinaikos (Greece) Olympiacos Piraeus (Greece) Iraklis Kifisias (Greece) GS Ilioupolis (Greece) Thetis Voula (Hungary) Békéscsabai RSE (Greece) Panathinaikos (Cyprus) Olympiada Neapolis (Greece) Panathinaikos (Greece) Olympiacos Piraeus

National team
Cyprus
- Last updated: 22 May 2026

Manolina Konstantinou (Greek: Μανωλίνα Κωνσταντίνου; born April 10, 1993, in Limassol, Cyprus) is a Cypriot female professional volleyball player, who is a member of the Cyprus women's national volleyball team. Konstantinou is also an accomplished beach volley player and won the silver medal at the 2017 Games of the Small States of Europe along with teammate Mariota Angelopoulou.

She competed for Cyprus at the 2022 Commonwealth Games, replacing Erika Nyström who could not compete due to an injury.

On club level she plays in 2026-27 season in Hellenic Volley League with Olympiacos Piraeus.

== Sporting achievements ==
=== National championships ===
- 2012/2013 Greek Championship, with Olympiacos Piraeus
- 2013/2014 Greek Championship, with Olympiacos Piraeus
- 2014/2015 Greek Championship, with Olympiacos Piraeus
- 2015/2016 Greek Championship, with Olympiacos Piraeus
- 2021/2022 Greek Championship, with Panathinaikos

=== National cups ===
- 2012/2013 Greek Cup, with Olympiacos Piraeus
- 2013/2014 Greek Cup, with Olympiacos Piraeus
- 2014/2015 Greek Cup, with Olympiacos Piraeus
- 2015/2016 Greek Cup, with Olympiacos Piraeus
- 2021/2022 Greek Cup, with Panathinaikos

=== Individuals ===
- 2012/2013 Greek Cup MVP
