= Miller Pata =

Vanuatuan beach volleyball player

Personal information
- Born: 11 June 1988 (age 38)

Sport
- Sport: Beach volleyball
Medal record
Women's beach volleyball
Representing Vanuatu
Commonwealth Games
Bronze medal – third place	2018 Gold Coast	Beach
Bronze medal – third place	2022 Birmingham	Beach
Pacific Games
Gold medal – first place	2011 Nouméa	Beach
Gold medal – first place	2019 Apia	Beach
Bronze medal – third place	2007 Apia	Beach
Oceania Championships
Silver medal – second place	2007 Apia	Beach

Miller Pata (born 11 June 1988) is a Vanuatuan beach volleyball player. She competed at the 2022 Commonwealth Games, in Beach volleyball winning a bronze medal.

She competed at the 2007 Oceania Championships, winning a silver medal, the 2018 Commonwealth Games, winning a bronze medal and the 2022 Commonwealth Games, winning a bronze medal.
