= Beach volleyball at the 2018 Asian Games =

- Venue: Jakabaring Beach Volley Arena
- Dates: 19–28 August 2018
- Competitors: 100 from 19 nations

Beach volleyball at the 2018 Asian Games was held in Palembang, Indonesia from 19–28 August 2018. In this edition, 19 nations played in the men's competition, and 10 nations participated in women's competition.

== Schedule ==
| P | Preliminary round | R | Round of 16 | ¼ | Quarterfinals | ½ | Semifinals | F | Finals |

| Event↓/Date → | 19th Sun | 20th Mon | 21st Tue | 22nd Wed | 23rd Thu | 24th Fri | 25th Sat | 26th Sun | 27th Mon | 28th Tue |
|---|---|---|---|---|---|---|---|---|---|---|
| Men | P | P | P | P | P | R | ¼ | ½ | | F |
| Women | P | P | P | P | P | R | ¼ | ½ | F | |

== Medalists ==
| Event | Gold | Silver | Bronze |
|---|---|---|---|
| Men | Qatar; Cherif Younousse; Ahmed Tijan | Indonesia; Ade Candra Rachmawan; Mohammad Ashfiya | Indonesia; Gilang Ramadhan; Danangsyah Pribadi |
| Women | China; Wang Fan; Xia Xinyi | Japan; Megumi Murakami; Miki Ishii | Indonesia; Dhita Juliana; Putu Dini Jasita Utami |

== Medal table ==
| Rank | Nation | Gold | Silver | Bronze | Total |
|---|---|---|---|---|---|
| 1 | China (CHN) | 1 | 0 | 0 | 1 |
| 1 | Qatar (QAT) | 1 | 0 | 0 | 1 |
| 3 | Indonesia (INA) | 0 | 1 | 2 | 3 |
| 4 | Japan (JPN) | 0 | 1 | 0 | 1 |
| Totals (4 entries) | | 2 | 2 | 2 | 6 |

== Participating nations ==
A total of 100 athletes from 19 nations competed in beach volleyball at the 2018 Asian Games:

- Afghanistan (4)
- Bangladesh (2)
- China (8)
- Chinese Taipei (8)
- Hong Kong (8)
- Indonesia (8)
- Iran (4)
- Japan (8)
- Kazakhstan (8)
- Malaysia (2)
- Maldives (4)
- Oman (4)
- Palestine (2)
- Qatar (4)
- South Korea (4)
- Sri Lanka (2)
- Thailand (8)
- Timor-Leste (4)
- Vietnam (8)

== Final standing ==
=== Men ===
| Rank | Team | Pld | W | L |
|---|---|---|---|---|
| 1st place, gold medalist(s) | Cherif Younousse – Ahmed Tijan (QAT) | 7 | 7 | 0 |
| 2nd place, silver medalist(s) | Ade Candra Rachmawan – Mohammad Ashfiya (INA) | 7 | 6 | 1 |
| 3rd place, bronze medalist(s) | Gilang Ramadhan – Danangsyah Pribadi (INA) | 7 | 6 | 1 |
| 4 | Gao Peng – Li Yang (CHN) | 7 | 5 | 2 |
| 5 | Abuduhalikejiang Mutailipu – Wu Jiaxin (CHN) | 5 | 4 | 1 |
| 5 | Rahman Raoufi – Abdolhamed Mirzaali (IRI) | 5 | 4 | 1 |
| 5 | Bahman Salemi – Arash Vakili (IRI) | 5 | 4 | 1 |
| 5 | Nouh Al-Jalbubi – Mazin Al-Hashmi (OMA) | 5 | 4 | 1 |
| 9 | Yuya Ageba – Katsuhiro Shiratori (JPN) | 4 | 2 | 2 |
| 9 | Keisuke Shimizu – Yoshiumi Hasegawa (JPN) | 4 | 2 | 2 |
| 9 | Sergey Bogatu – Dmitriy Yakovlev (KAZ) | 4 | 2 | 2 |
| 9 | Alexey Kuleshov – Alexandr Babichev (KAZ) | 4 | 2 | 2 |
| 9 | Haitham Al-Shereiqi – Ahmed Al-Housni (OMA) | 4 | 2 | 2 |
| 9 | Mohammed Al-Qishawi – Khaled Al-Arqan (PLE) | 4 | 2 | 2 |
| 9 | Nuttanon Inkiew – Sedtawat Padsawud (THA) | 4 | 2 | 2 |
| 9 | Surin Jongklang – Adisorn Khaolumtarn (THA) | 4 | 2 | 2 |
| 17 | Md Monir Hossain – Md Shahjahan Ali (BAN) | 3 | 1 | 2 |
| 17 | Yeung Pok Man – Chui Kam Lung (HKG) | 3 | 1 | 2 |
| 17 | Rafi Asruki Nordin – Raja Nazmi Saifuddin (MAS) | 3 | 1 | 2 |
| 17 | Tamer Abdelrasoul – Mahdi Sammoud (QAT) | 3 | 1 | 2 |
| 17 | Asanka Pradeep Kumara – Malintha Yapa (SRI) | 3 | 1 | 2 |
| 17 | Wang Chin-ju – Hsieh Ya-jen (TPE) | 3 | 1 | 2 |
| 17 | Lý Văn Quốc – Nguyễn Ngọc Quý (VIE) | 3 | 1 | 2 |
| 17 | Nguyễn Bá Trường Đăng – Phạm Lê Đình Khôi (VIE) | 3 | 1 | 2 |
| 25 | Mohib Jan Ahmadi – Ozair Mohammad Asifi (AFG) | 3 | 0 | 3 |
| 25 | Obaidullah Alikhail – Najibullah Mayar (AFG) | 3 | 0 | 3 |
| 25 | Wong Pui Lam – Kelvin Lau (HKG) | 3 | 0 | 3 |
| 25 | Kim Jun-young – Kim Hong-chan (KOR) | 3 | 0 | 3 |
| 25 | Ashfag Adam – Mohamed Ahmed (MDV) | 3 | 0 | 3 |
| 25 | Ismail Sajid – Shiunaz Abdul Wahid (MDV) | 3 | 0 | 3 |
| 25 | Inocêncio Xavier – Robson Xavier (TLS) | 3 | 0 | 3 |
| 25 | Hsu Chen-wei – Wu Shin-shian (TPE) | 3 | 0 | 3 |

=== Women ===
| Rank | Team | Pld | W | L |
|---|---|---|---|---|
| 1st place, gold medalist(s) | Wang Fan – Xia Xinyi (CHN) | 6 | 6 | 0 |
| 2nd place, silver medalist(s) | Megumi Murakami – Miki Ishii (JPN) | 6 | 5 | 1 |
| 3rd place, bronze medalist(s) | Dhita Juliana – Putu Dini Jasita Utami (INA) | 8 | 5 | 3 |
| 4 | Tatyana Mashkova – Irina Tsimbalova (KAZ) | 7 | 5 | 2 |
| 5 | Wang Xinxin – Zeng Jinjin (CHN) | 5 | 3 | 2 |
| 5 | Desi Ratnasari – Yokebed Purari Eka (INA) | 6 | 4 | 2 |
| 5 | Akiko Hasegawa – Azusa Futami (JPN) | 5 | 4 | 1 |
| 5 | Varapatsorn Radarong – Tanarattha Udomchavee (THA) | 6 | 4 | 2 |
| 9 | Yuen Ting Chi – Au Yeung Wai Yan (HKG) | 4 | 1 | 3 |
| 9 | Rumpaipruet Numwong – Khanittha Hongpak (THA) | 5 | 2 | 3 |
| 9 | Kou Nai-han – Liu Pi-hsin (TPE) | 4 | 2 | 2 |
| 9 | Yu Ya-hsuan – Pan Tzu-yi (TPE) | 4 | 1 | 3 |
| 13 | Ng Tin Lai – Wong Yuen Mei (HKG) | 4 | 1 | 3 |
| 13 | Alina Rachenko – Yelizaveta Yeropkina (KAZ) | 4 | 1 | 3 |
| 13 | Kim Hyun-ji – Kim Ha-na (KOR) | 3 | 0 | 3 |
| 13 | Trần Cẩm Thi – Trương Dương Thị Mỹ Huyền (VIE) | 3 | 0 | 3 |
| 17 | Letícia de Sousa – Adilijia Caminha (TLS) | 4 | 0 | 4 |
| 17 | Nguyễn Thị Cẩm Tiên – Huỳnh Đỗ Hồng Loan (VIE) | 4 | 0 | 4 |
