= Beach volleyball at the 2022 Asian Games =

- Venue: Banbianshan Beach
- Dates: 19–28 September 2023
- Competitors: 94 from 17 nations

Beach volleyball at the 2022 Asian Games was held in Ningbo, China from 19 to 28 September 2023. In this edition, 16 nations played in the men's competition, and 11 nations participated in the women's competition.

== Schedule ==
P	Preliminary round	R	Round of 16	¼	Quarterfinals	½	Semifinals	F	Finals

Event↓/Date →	19th Tue	20th Wed	21st Thu	22nd Fri	23rd Sat	24th Sun	25th Mon	26th Tue	27th Wed	28th Thu
Men	P	P	P	P		R	¼	½		F
Women	P	P	P	P		R	¼	½	F	

== Medalists ==
Event	Gold	Silver	Bronze
Men	Qatar; Cherif Younousse; Ahmed Tijan	China; Abuduhalikejiang Mutailipu; Wu Jiaxin	Kazakhstan; Sergey Bogatu; Dmitriy Yakovlev
Women	China; Xue Chen; Xia Xinyi	Japan; Sayaka Mizoe; Miki Ishii	China; Wang Fan; Dong Jie

== Medal table ==
Rank	Nation	Gold	Silver	Bronze	Total
1	China (CHN)	1	1	1	3
2	Qatar (QAT)	1	0	0	1
3	Japan (JPN)	0	1	0	1
4	Kazakhstan (KAZ)	0	0	1	1
Totals (4 entries)		2	2	2	6

== Participating nations ==
A total of 94 athletes from 17 nations competed in beach volleyball at the 2022 Asian Games:

- China (8)
- Hong Kong (6)
- Indonesia (8)
- Iran (4)
- Japan (6)
- Kazakhstan (8)
- Macau (8)
- Maldives (2)
- Oman (4)
- Palestine (4)
- Philippines (8)
- Qatar (4)
- South Korea (8)
- Sri Lanka (2)
- Tajikistan (4)
- Thailand (8)
- Timor-Leste (2)

== Final standing ==
=== Men ===
Rank	Team	Pld	W	L
1st place, gold medalist(s)	Cherif Younousse – Ahmed Tijan (QAT)	6	6	0
2nd place, silver medalist(s)	Abuduhalikejiang Mutailipu – Wu Jiaxin (CHN)	6	5	1
3rd place, bronze medalist(s)	Sergey Bogatu – Dmitriy Yakovlev (KAZ)	7	6	1
4	Abbas Pouraskari – Alireza Aghajani (IRI)	7	5	2
5	Wang Yanwei – Li Jie (CHN)	4	3	1
5	Mohammad Ashfiya – Bintang Akbar (INA)	4	3	1
5	Bahman Salemi – Sina Shokati (IRI)	5	4	1
5	Nurdos Aldash – Kirill Gurin (KAZ)	4	2	2
9	Danangsyah Pribadi – Sofyan Rachman Efendi (INA)	3	1	2
9	Takumi Takahashi – Yuya Ageba (JPN)	3	1	2
9	Ahmed Al-Housni – Haitham Al-Shereiqi (OMA)	4	2	2
9	Nouh Al-Jalbubi – Mazin Al-Hashmi (OMA)	4	2	2
9	Jude Garcia – James Buytrago (PHI)	3	1	2
9	Mahmoud Assam – Abdallah Nassim (QAT)	4	2	2
9	Dunwinit Kaewsai – Surin Jongklang (THA)	3	1	2
9	Poravid Taovato – Pithak Tipjan (THA)	3	2	1
17	Wong Pui Lam – Lam Ki Fung (HKG)	2	0	2
17	Lee Dong-seok – Kim Jun-young (KOR)	3	1	2
17	Ismail Sajid – Adam Naseem (MDV)	2	0	2
17	Jaron Requinton – Ranran Abdilla (PHI)	2	0	2
17	Taleb Al-Najjar – Mohammed Al-Qishawi (PLE)	2	0	2
17	Abdallah Al-Arqan – Ibrahim Qusaya (PLE)	2	0	2
17	Muhsini Rustamzoda – Mukhamadrasul Tursunov (TJK)	3	1	2
17	Fabricius Correia – Joel Valente (TLS)	3	1	2
25	Kim Myeong-jin – Bae In-ho (KOR)	3	0	3
25	Cheong Hou Wang – Wong Wai Hei (MAC)	3	0	3
25	Tam Chit Meng – Chan Ka Lon (MAC)	3	0	3

=== Women ===
Rank	Team	Pld	W	L
1st place, gold medalist(s)	Xue Chen – Xia Xinyi (CHN)	8	8	0
2nd place, silver medalist(s)	Sayaka Mizoe – Miki Ishii (JPN)	8	7	1
3rd place, bronze medalist(s)	Wang Fan – Dong Jie (CHN)	8	7	1
4	Taravadee Naraphornrapat – Worapeerachayakorn Kongphopsarutawadee (THA)	8	6	2
5	Dhita Juliana – Desi Ratnasari (INA)	6	4	2
5	Akiko Hasegawa – Yurika Sakaguchi (JPN)	6	4	2
5	Floremel Rodriguez – Genesa Jane Eslapor (PHI)	6	4	2
5	Woranatchayakorn Phirachayakrailert – Charanrutwadee Patcharamainaruebhorn (THA)	6	4	2
9	Wong Man Ching – To Wing Tung (HKG)	5	1	4
9	Yuen Ting Chi – Lo Wai Yan (HKG)	5	1	4
9	Nur Atika Sari – Bernadetta Shella Herdanti (INA)	5	2	3
9	Laura Kabulbekova – Nadezhda Ivanchenko (KAZ)	5	2	3
9	Alina Rachenko – Anastassiya Ukolova (KAZ)	5	1	4
9	Law Weng Sam – Leong On Ieng (MAC)	5	2	3
9	Kyhlem Progella – Grydelle Matibag (PHI)	5	2	3
9	Deepika Bandara – Chathurika Weerasinghe (SRI)	5	1	4
17	Lee Ho-bin – Jeon Ha-ri (KOR)	4	0	4
17	Shin Ji-eun – Kim Se-yeon (KOR)	4	0	4
17	Tam Kin Teng – Lei Keng Lai (MAC)	4	0	4
17	Zamira Badalbekova – Anisa Khurshedodova (TJK)	4	0	4
