= 2017 Asian Beach Volleyball Championships =

International beach volleyball competition

- Location: Songkhla, Thailand
- Dates: 14–17 April 2017

The 2017 Asian Beach Volleyball Championships were staged from 14 to 17 April 2017 in Songkhla, Thailand. The Asian Beach Volleyball Championships are organized every year and Thailand hosted the event for the third time.

== Medal summary ==
Event	Gold	Silver	Bronze
Men	Iran; Rahman Raoufi; Bahman Salemi	Indonesia; Ade Candra Rachmawan; Mohammad Ashfiya	Australia; Chris McHugh; Damien Schumann
Women	Australia; Louise Bawden; Taliqua Clancy	China; Wang Fan; Yue Yuan	Australia; Phoebe Bell; Nicole Laird

== Participating nations ==
=== Men ===
- Australia (3)
- China (2)
- Hong Kong (2)
- Indonesia (2)
- Iran (2)
- Japan (2)
- Kazakhstan (2)
- Laos (1)
- Maldives (2)
- New Zealand (3)
- Oman (2)
- Qatar (2)
- Saudi Arabia (1)
- Singapore (1)
- Sri Lanka (2)
- Thailand (3)

=== Women ===
- Australia (3)
- China (2)
- Hong Kong (2)
- Indonesia (2)
- Japan (3)
- Kazakhstan (2)
- Macau (1)
- New Zealand (3)
- Singapore (1)
- Sri Lanka (2)
- Thailand (4)
- Vanuatu (1)
- Vietnam (2)

== Men's tournament ==
=== Preliminary round ===
==== Pool A ====
Pos	Team	Pld	W	L	Pts	SW	SL	SR	SPW	SPL	SPR
1	(Australia) McHugh–Schumann	3	2	1	5	5	2	2.500	139	106	1.311
2	(Iran) R. Raoufi–B. Salemi	3	2	1	5	4	3	1.333	133	117	1.137
3	(Oman) Ahmed–Badar	3	2	1	5	4	2	2.000	114	103	1.107
4	(Singapore) G.J.P. Tan–Zhuo	3	0	3	3	0	6	0.000	66	126	0.524

Source: AVC

Date		Score		Set 1	Set 2	Set 3
14 Apr	McHugh–Schumann (Australia)	2–0	(Singapore) G.J.P. Tan–Zhuo	21–10	21–10	
14 Apr	R. Raoufi–B. Salemi (Iran)	0–2	(Oman) Ahmed–Badar	17–21	18–21	
14 Apr	McHugh–Schumann (Australia)	2–0	(Oman) Ahmed–Badar	21–15	21–15	
14 Apr	R. Raoufi–B. Salemi (Iran)	2–0	(Singapore) G.J.P. Tan–Zhuo	21–10	21–10	
15 Apr	McHugh–Schumann (Australia)	1–2	(Iran) R. Raoufi–B. Salemi	21–17	22–24	12–15
15 Apr	Ahmed–Badar (Oman)	2–0	(Singapore) G.J.P. Tan–Zhuo	21–16	21–10	

==== Pool B ====
Pos	Team	Pld	W	L	Pts	SW	SL	SR	SPW	SPL	SPR
1	(Qatar) Júlio–Ahmed Tijan	3	3	0	6	6	1	6.000	138	100	1.380
2	(Japan) Kurasaka–Hasegawa	3	2	1	5	4	3	1.333	124	124	1.000
3	(New Zealand) Watson–Hartles	3	1	2	4	4	4	1.000	138	139	0.993
4	(Hong Kong) Wong–Pong	3	0	3	3	0	6	0.000	89	126	0.706

Source: AVC

Date		Score		Set 1	Set 2	Set 3
14 Apr	Júlio–Ahmed Tijan (Qatar)	2–0	(Hong Kong) Wong–Pong	21–11	21–9	
14 Apr	Watson–Hartles (New Zealand)	1–2	(Japan) Kurasaka–Hasegawa	13–21	21–15	13–15
14 Apr	Júlio–Ahmed Tijan (Qatar)	2–0	(Japan) Kurasaka–Hasegawa	21–14	21–17	
14 Apr	Watson–Hartles (New Zealand)	2–0	(Hong Kong) Wong–Pong	21–19	21–15	
15 Apr	Júlio–Ahmed Tijan (Qatar)	2–1	(New Zealand) Watson–Hartles	21–19	18–21	15–9
15 Apr	Kurasaka–Hasegawa (Japan)	2–0	(Hong Kong) Wong–Pong	21–19	21–16	

==== Pool C ====
Pos	Team	Pld	W	L	Pts	SW	SL	SR	SPW	SPL	SPR
1	(Qatar) Jefferson–Cherif	3	3	0	6	6	0	MAX	126	74	1.703
2	(China) Li Zhuoxin–Ch.W. Zhou	3	2	1	5	4	2	2.000	115	101	1.139
3	(Hong Kong) Lam–Kelvin	3	1	2	4	2	4	0.500	98	106	0.925
4	(Laos) Lid–Sin	3	0	3	3	0	6	0.000	68	126	0.540

Source: AVC

Date		Score		Set 1	Set 2	Set 3
14 Apr	Jefferson–Cherif (Qatar)	2–0	(Laos) Lid–Sin	21–12	21–9	
14 Apr	Li Zhuoxin–Ch.W. Zhou (China)	2–0	(Hong Kong) Lam–Kelvin	21–19	21–15	
14 Apr	Jefferson–Cherif (Qatar)	2–0	(Hong Kong) Lam–Kelvin	21–10	21–12	
14 Apr	Li Zhuoxin–Ch.W. Zhou (China)	2–0	(Laos) Lid–Sin	21–14	21–11	
15 Apr	Jefferson–Cherif (Qatar)	2–0	(China) Li Zhuoxin–Ch.W. Zhou	21–13	21–18	
15 Apr	Lam–Kelvin (Hong Kong)	2–0	(Laos) Lid–Sin	21–9	21–13	

==== Pool D ====
Pos	Team	Pld	W	L	Pts	SW	SL	SR	SPW	SPL	SPR
1	(Kazakhstan) Sidorenko–Dyachenko	3	3	0	6	6	1	6.000	138	104	1.327
2	(Japan) Takahashi–Shiratori	3	2	1	5	5	2	2.500	131	103	1.272
3	(Sri Lanka) Anjana–Dileepa	3	1	2	4	2	4	0.500	103	107	0.963
4	(Maldives) Anil–Adnan	3	0	3	3	0	6	0.000	68	126	0.540

Source: AVC

Date		Score		Set 1	Set 2	Set 3
14 Apr	Sidorenko–Dyachenko (Kazakhstan)	2–0	(Sri Lanka) Anjana–Dileepa	21–15	21–16	
14 Apr	Takahashi–Shiratori (Japan)	2–0	(Maldives) Anil–Adnan	21–11	21–8	
14 Apr	Sidorenko–Dyachenko (Kazakhstan)	2–0	(Maldives) Anil–Adnan	21–15	21–11	
14 Apr	Takahashi–Shiratori (Japan)	2–0	(Sri Lanka) Anjana–Dileepa	21–15	21–15	
15 Apr	Sidorenko–Dyachenko (Kazakhstan)	2–1	(Japan) Takahashi–Shiratori	21–17	18–21	15–9
15 Apr	Anil–Adnan (Maldives)	0–2	(Sri Lanka) Anjana–Dileepa	11–21	12–21	

==== Pool E ====
Pos	Team	Pld	W	L	Pts	SW	SL	SR	SPW	SPL	SPR
1	(Indonesia) Gilang–Danang	3	3	0	6	6	0	MAX	126	86	1.465
2	(Kazakhstan) Yakovlev–Kuleshov	3	2	1	5	4	2	2.000	113	114	0.991
3	(Maldives) Adam–Shiunaz	3	1	2	4	2	5	0.400	116	132	0.879
4	(Saudi Arabia) Hassan–Ahmed	3	0	3	3	1	6	0.167	114	137	0.832

Source: AVC

Date		Score		Set 1	Set 2	Set 3
14 Apr	Yakovlev–Kuleshov (Kazakhstan)	2–0	(Saudi Arabia) Hassan–Ahmed	21–19	21–16	
14 Apr	Gilang–Danang (Indonesia)	2–0	(Maldives) Adam–Shiunaz	21–12	21–14	
14 Apr	Yakovlev–Kuleshov (Kazakhstan)	2–0	(Maldives) Adam–Shiunaz	21–18	21–19	
14 Apr	Gilang–Danang (Indonesia)	2–0	(Saudi Arabia) Hassan–Ahmed	21–18	21–13	
15 Apr	Yakovlev–Kuleshov (Kazakhstan)	0–2	(Indonesia) Gilang–Danang	14–21	15–21	
15 Apr	Adam–Shiunaz (Maldives)	2–1	(Saudi Arabia) Hassan–Ahmed	21–17	17–21	15–10

==== Pool F ====
Pos	Team	Pld	W	L	Pts	SW	SL	SR	SPW	SPL	SPR
1	(Indonesia) Candra–Ashfiya	3	3	0	6	6	1	6.000	139	111	1.252
2	(Australia) Durant–Schubert	3	2	1	5	5	2	2.500	132	116	1.138
3	(New Zealand) Kapa–Seymour	3	1	2	4	2	4	0.500	100	119	0.840
4	(Thailand) K. Adisorn–B. Marudet	3	0	3	3	0	6	0.000	101	126	0.802

Source: AVC

Date		Score		Set 1	Set 2	Set 3
14 Apr	Candra–Ashfiya (Indonesia)	2–0	(New Zealand) Kapa–Seymour	21–15	21–11	
14 Apr	Durant–Schubert (Australia)	2–0	(Thailand) K. Adisorn–B. Marudet	21–14	21–15	
14 Apr	Candra–Ashfiya (Indonesia)	2–0	(Thailand) K. Adisorn–B. Marudet	21–19	21–18	
14 Apr	Durant–Schubert (Australia)	2–0	(New Zealand) Kapa–Seymour	21–17	21–15	
15 Apr	Candra–Ashfiya (Indonesia)	2–1	(Australia) Durant–Schubert	19–21	21–15	15–12
15 Apr	K. Adisorn–B. Marudet (Thailand)	0–2	(New Zealand) Kapa–Seymour	17–21	18–21	

==== Pool G ====
Pos	Team	Pld	W	L	Pts	SW	SL	SR	SPW	SPL	SPR
1	(China) Ha Likejiang–Bao J.	3	3	0	6	6	0	MAX	126	81	1.556
2	(Sri Lanka) Asanka–Yapa	3	2	1	5	4	3	1.333	134	131	1.023
3	(Australia) Dickson–Kapa	3	1	2	4	3	4	0.750	132	135	0.978
4	(Thailand) D. Kitti–J. Surin	3	0	3	3	0	6	0.000	81	126	0.643

Source: AVC

Date		Score		Set 1	Set 2	Set 3
14 Apr	Dickson–Kapa (Australia)	2–0	(Thailand) D. Kitti–J. Surin	21–17	21–12	
14 Apr	Ha Likejiang–Bao J. (China)	2–0	(Sri Lanka) Asanka–Yapa	21–15	21–13	
14 Apr	Dickson–Kapa (Australia)	1–2	(Sri Lanka) Asanka–Yapa	26–28	22–20	14–16
14 Apr	Ha Likejiang–Bao J. (China)	2–0	(Thailand) D. Kitti–J. Surin	21–13	21–12	
15 Apr	Dickson–Kapa (Australia)	0–2	(China) Ha Likejiang–Bao J.	15–21	13–21	
15 Apr	Asanka–Yapa (Sri Lanka)	2–0	(Thailand) D. Kitti–J. Surin	21–11	21–16	

==== Pool H ====
Pos	Team	Pld	W	L	Pts	SW	SL	SR	SPW	SPL	SPR
1	(Thailand) I. Nuttanon–P. Sedtawat	3	3	0	6	6	0	MAX	126	56	2.250
2	(Iran) A. Pourasgari–A. Vakili	3	2	1	5	4	2	2.000	112	89	1.258
3	(New Zealand) O'Dea–O'Dea	3	1	2	4	2	4	0.500	67	105	0.638
4	(Oman) Mohammed–Hood	3	0	3	3	0	6	0.000	71	126	0.563

Source: AVC

Date		Score		Set 1	Set 2	Set 3
14 Apr	I. Nuttanon–P. Sedtawat (Thailand)	2–0	(Oman) Mohammed–Hood	21–17	21–11	
14 Apr	O'Dea–O'Dea (New Zealand)	0–2	(Iran) A. Pourasgari–A. Vakili	11–21	14–21	
14 Apr	I. Nuttanon–P. Sedtawat (Thailand)	2–0	(Iran) A. Pourasgari–A. Vakili	21–17	21–11	
14 Apr	O'Dea–O'Dea (New Zealand)	2–0	(Oman) Mohammed–Hood	21–6	21–15	
15 Apr	I. Nuttanon–P. Sedtawat (Thailand)	2–0	(New Zealand) O'Dea–O'Dea	Walkover		
15 Apr	A. Pourasgari–A. Vakili (Iran)	2–0	(Oman) Mohammed–Hood	21–13	21–9	

=== Knockout round ===
Round of 16; 15 April
(Qatar) Júlio–Ahmed Tijan	21	21
(China) Li Zhuoxin–Ch.W. Zhou	15	11
(Australia) Durant–Schubert	15	17
(Indonesia) Gilang–Danang	21	21
(China) Ha Likejiang–Bao J.	21	21
(Iran) A. Pourasgari–A. Vakili	17	13
(Iran) R. Raoufi–B. Salemi	21	16	17
(Kazakhstan) Sidorenko–Dyachenko	17	21	15
(Qatar) Jefferson–Cherif	21	16	15
(Japan) Kurasaka–Hasegawa	12	21	10
(Sri Lanka) Asanka–Yapa	13	16
(Indonesia) Candra–Ashfiya	21	21
(Thailand) I. Nuttanon–P. Sedtawat	17	21	15
(Kazakhstan) Yakovlev–Kuleshov	21	15	9
(Japan) Takahashi–Shiratori	16	14
(Australia) McHugh–Schumann	21	21

Quarterfinals; 16 April
(Qatar) Júlio–Ahmed Tijan	21	21
(Indonesia) Gilang–Danang	15	18
(China) Ha Likejiang–Bao J.	11	15
(Iran) R. Raoufi–B. Salemi	21	21
(Qatar) Jefferson–Cherif	17	21	13
(Indonesia) Candra–Ashfiya	21	7	15
(Thailand) I. Nuttanon–P. Sedtawat	14	19
(Australia) McHugh–Schumann	21	21

Semifinals; 16 April
(Qatar) Júlio–Ahmed Tijan	29	20	10
(Iran) R. Raoufi–B. Salemi	27	22	15
(Indonesia) Candra–Ashfiya	21	21
(Australia) McHugh–Schumann	18	16

Final; 17 April
(Iran) R. Raoufi–B. Salemi	22	12	15
(Indonesia) Candra–Ashfiya	20	21	12
3rd place
(Qatar) Júlio–Ahmed Tijan	21	14
(Australia) McHugh–Schumann	23	21

== Women's tournament ==
=== Preliminary round ===
==== Pool A ====
Pos	Team	Pld	W	L	Pts	SW	SL	SR	SPW	SPL	SPR
1	(Thailand) Radarong–Udomchavee	2	2	0	4	4	1	4.000	97	58	1.672
2	(Japan) Mizoe–Hashimoto	2	1	1	3	3	2	1.500	83	81	1.025
3	(Vietnam) Lê–Tứ	2	0	2	2	0	4	0.000	43	84	0.512

Source: AVC

Date		Score		Set 1	Set 2	Set 3
14 Apr	Mizoe–Hashimoto (Japan)	2–0	(Vietnam) Lê–Tứ	21–10	21–16	
14 Apr	Radarong–Udomchavee (Thailand)	2–0	(Vietnam) Lê–Tứ	21–7	21–10	
15 Apr	Radarong–Udomchavee (Thailand)	2–1	(Japan) Mizoe–Hashimoto	21–12	19–21	15–8

==== Pool B ====
Pos	Team	Pld	W	L	Pts	SW	SL	SR	SPW	SPL	SPR
1	(Australia) Bawden–Clancy	2	2	0	4	4	0	MAX	84	48	1.750
2	(Thailand) Khantarak–Laosaengsa	2	1	1	3	2	2	1.000	64	72	0.889
3	(Hong Kong) Tin Lai–Yuen Mei	2	0	2	2	0	4	0.000	56	84	0.667

Source: AVC

Date		Score		Set 1	Set 2	Set 3
14 Apr	Tin Lai–Yuen Mei (Hong Kong)	0–2	(Thailand) Khantarak–Laosaengsa	16–21	14–21	
14 Apr	Bawden–Clancy (Australia)	2–0	(Thailand) Khantarak–Laosaengsa	21–11	21–11	
15 Apr	Bawden–Clancy (Australia)	2–0	(Hong Kong) Tin Lai–Yuen Mei	21–13	21–13	

==== Pool C ====
Pos	Team	Pld	W	L	Pts	SW	SL	SR	SPW	SPL	SPR
1	(China) Wang–Yue	2	2	0	4	4	0	MAX	84	56	1.500
2	(Japan) Hasegawa–Futami	2	1	1	3	2	2	1.000	77	76	1.013
3	(Indonesia) Desi–Yokebad	2	0	2	2	0	4	0.000	55	84	0.655

Source: AVC

Date		Score		Set 1	Set 2	Set 3
14 Apr	Desi–Yokebad (Indonesia)	0–2	(Japan) Hasegawa–Futami	17–21	17–21	
14 Apr	Wang–Yue (China)	2–0	(Japan) Hasegawa–Futami	21–19	21–16	
15 Apr	Wang–Yue (China)	2–0	(Indonesia) Desi–Yokebad	21–8	21–13	

==== Pool D ====
Pos	Team	Pld	W	L	Pts	SW	SL	SR	SPW	SPL	SPR
1	(Australia) Bell–Laird	2	2	0	4	4	1	4.000	95	75	1.267
2	(Japan) Suzuki–Ishii	2	1	1	3	3	2	1.500	90	74	1.216
3	(Sri Lanka) Gnanasagari–Chathurika	2	0	2	2	0	4	0.000	48	84	0.571

Source: AVC

Date		Score		Set 1	Set 2	Set 3
14 Apr	Suzuki–Ishii (Japan)	2–0	(Sri Lanka) Gnanasagari–Chathurika	21–10	21–11	
14 Apr	Bell–Laird (Australia)	2–0	(Sri Lanka) Gnanasagari–Chathurika	21–16	21–11	
15 Apr	Bell–Laird (Australia)	2–1	(Japan) Suzuki–Ishii	21–17	17–21	15–10

==== Pool E ====
Pos	Team	Pld	W	L	Pts	SW	SL	SR	SPW	SPL	SPR
1	(Vanuatu) Joe–Matauatu	3	3	0	6	6	0	MAX	126	96	1.313
2	(Kazakhstan) Tsimbalova–Nikitina	3	1	2	4	3	5	0.600	134	128	1.047
3	(Hong Kong) Au Yeung–Yuen T.C.	3	1	2	4	3	5	0.600	127	143	0.888
4	(Vietnam) Trần–Hoa	3	1	2	4	3	5	0.600	123	143	0.860

Source: AVC

Date		Score		Set 1	Set 2	Set 3
14 Apr	Joe–Matauatu (Vanuatu)	2–0	(Hong Kong) Au Yeung–Yuen T.C.	21–14	21–19	
14 Apr	Tsimbalova–Nikitina (Kazakhstan)	2–1	(Vietnam) Trần–Hoa	16–21	21–8	15–12
14 Apr	Joe–Matauatu (Vanuatu)	2–0	(Vietnam) Trần–Hoa	21–15	21–17	
14 Apr	Tsimbalova–Nikitina (Kazakhstan)	1–2	(Hong Kong) Au Yeung–Yuen T.C.	21–9	17–21	13–15
15 Apr	Joe–Matauatu (Vanuatu)	2–0	(Kazakhstan) Tsimbalova–Nikitina	21–16	21–15	
15 Apr	Trần–Hoa (Vietnam)	2–1	(Hong Kong) Au Yeung–Yuen T.C.	14–21	21–19	15–9

==== Pool F ====
Pos	Team	Pld	W	L	Pts	SW	SL	SR	SPW	SPL	SPR
1	(New Zealand) Polley–Wills	3	3	0	6	6	2	3.000	153	122	1.254
2	(Thailand) Numwong–Hongpak	3	2	1	5	5	3	1.667	155	119	1.303
3	(China) Wang X.X.–Xue	3	1	2	4	4	4	1.000	145	128	1.133
4	(Sri Lanka) Deepika–Kasuni	3	0	3	3	0	6	0.000	42	126	0.333

Source: AVC

Date		Score		Set 1	Set 2	Set 3
14 Apr	Wang X.X.–Xue (China)	1–2	(New Zealand) Polley–Wills	21–17	19–21	11–15
14 Apr	Numwong–Hongpak (Thailand)	2–0	(Sri Lanka) Deepika–Kasuni	21–6	21–3	
14 Apr	Wang X.X.–Xue (China)	2–0	(Sri Lanka) Deepika–Kasuni	21–11	21–9	
14 Apr	Numwong–Hongpak (Thailand)	1–2	(New Zealand) Polley–Wills	21–15	26–28	11–15
15 Apr	Wang X.X.–Xue (China)	1–2	(Thailand) Numwong–Hongpak	21–19	18–21	13–15
15 Apr	Deepika–Kasuni (Sri Lanka)	0–2	(New Zealand) Polley–Wills	10–21	3–21	

==== Pool G ====
Pos	Team	Pld	W	L	Pts	SW	SL	SR	SPW	SPL	SPR
1	(Australia) Ngauamo–Palmer	3	3	0	6	6	1	6.000	135	67	2.015
2	(New Zealand) Tilley–Bain	3	2	1	5	5	2	2.500	131	84	1.560
3	(Macau) Lei–Tam	3	1	2	4	2	4	0.500	64	115	0.557
4	(Singapore) Lee–E. Chong	3	0	3	3	0	6	0.000	62	126	0.492

Source: AVC

Date		Score		Set 1	Set 2	Set 3
14 Apr	Tilley–Bain (New Zealand)	2–0	(Macau) Lei–Tam	21–9	21–2	
14 Apr	Ngauamo–Palmer (Australia)	2–0	(Singapore) Lee–E. Chong	21–5	21–4	
14 Apr	Tilley–Bain (New Zealand)	2–0	(Singapore) Lee–E. Chong	21–10	21–12	
14 Apr	Ngauamo–Palmer (Australia)	2–0	(Macau) Lei–Tam	21–5	21–6	
15 Apr	Tilley–Bain (New Zealand)	1–2	(Australia) Ngauamo–Palmer	21–15	15–21	11–15
15 Apr	Lee–E. Chong (Singapore)	0–2	(Macau) Lei–Tam	12–21	19–21	

==== Pool H ====
Pos	Team	Pld	W	L	Pts	SW	SL	SR	SPW	SPL	SPR
1	(Kazakhstan) Mashkova–Samalikova	3	3	0	6	6	0	MAX	126	74	1.703
2	(Indonesia) Putu–Dhita	3	2	1	5	4	2	2.000	110	91	1.209
3	(New Zealand) Lindsay-Brown–Quigley	3	1	2	4	2	5	0.400	112	146	0.767
4	(Thailand) Pawarun–Thatsarida	3	0	3	3	1	6	0.167	111	148	0.750

Source: AVC

Date		Score		Set 1	Set 2	Set 3
14 Apr	Putu–Dhita (Indonesia)	2–0	(Thailand) Pawarun–Thatsarida	21–15	21–13	
14 Apr	Mashkova–Samalikova (Kazakhstan)	2–0	(New Zealand) Lindsay-Brown–Quigley	21–15	21–12	
14 Apr	Putu–Dhita (Indonesia)	2–0	(New Zealand) Lindsay-Brown–Quigley	21–13	21–8	
14 Apr	Mashkova–Samalikova (Kazakhstan)	2–0	(Thailand) Pawarun–Thatsarida	21–13	21–8	
15 Apr	Putu–Dhita (Indonesia)	0–2	(Kazakhstan) Mashkova–Samalikova	12–21	14–21	
15 Apr	Lindsay-Brown–Quigley (New Zealand)	2–1	(Thailand) Pawarun–Thatsarida	26–24	21–23	17–15

=== Knockout round ===
Round of 16; 15 April
(Thailand) Radarong–Udomchavee	21	16	12
(Japan) Suzuki–Ishii	15	21	15
(Indonesia) Putu–Dhita	22	14	15
(Vanuatu) Joe–Matauatu	20	21	11
(Kazakhstan) Mashkova–Samalikova	21	21
(New Zealand) Tilley–Bain	18	12
(Japan) Mizoe–Hashimoto	16	14
(China) Wang–Yue	21	21
(Australia) Bell–Laird	21	21
(Thailand) Khantarak–Laosaengsa	13	15
(Thailand) Numwong–Hongpak	17	21	15
(Australia) Ngauamo–Palmer	21	19	13
(New Zealand) Polley–Wills	21	21
(Kazakhstan) Tsimbalova–Nikitina	16	14
(Japan) Hasegawa–Futami	15	17
(Australia) Bawden–Clancy	21	21

Quarterfinals; 16 April
(Japan) Suzuki–Ishii	19	14
(Indonesia) Putu–Dhita	21	21
(Kazakhstan) Mashkova–Samalikova	16	14
(China) Wang–Yue	21	21
(Australia) Bell–Laird	21	21
(Thailand) Numwong–Hongpak	16	15
(New Zealand) Polley–Wills	10	10
(Australia) Bawden–Clancy	21	21

Semifinals; 16 April
(Indonesia) Putu–Dhita	16	18
(China) Wang–Yue	21	21
(Australia) Bell–Laird	14	14
(Australia) Bawden–Clancy	21	21

Final; 17 April
(China) Wang–Yue	19	17
(Australia) Bawden–Clancy	21	21
3rd place
(Indonesia) Putu–Dhita	8	21	8
(Australia) Bell–Laird	21	17	15
