= Ade Candra Rachmawan =

Indonesian beach volleyball player (born 1992)

Personal information
- Nationality: Indonesian
- Born: 3 December 1992 (age 33) Yogyakarta, Indonesia
- Height: 1.92 m (6 ft 4 in)
- Weight: 81 kg (179 lb)

Sport
- Country: Indonesia
- Sport: Beach Volleyball
Medal record
Men's beach volleyball
Representing Indonesia
Asian Games
Silver medal – second place	2018 Jakarta-Palembang	Men
Asian Beach Games
Gold medal – first place	2012 Haiyang	Men
Gold medal – first place	2014 Phuket	Men
Asian Championships
Silver medal – second place	2017 Songkhla	Men
Bronze medal – third place	2012 Haikou	Men
AVC Continental Cup
Silver medal – second place	2020 Nakhon Pathom	Men
Islamic Solidarity Games
Silver medal – second place	2013 Palembang	Men
SEA Games
Gold medal – first place	2019 Philippines	Men
Gold medal – first place	2021 Vietnam	Men
Gold medal – first place	2023 Cambodia	Men
Silver medal – second place	2011 Jakarta–Palembang	Men
Southeast Asian Championships
Gold medal – first place	2017 Singapore	Men
Asian Youth Games
Bronze medal – third place	2009 Singapore	Boys

Ade Candra Rachmawan (born 3 December 1992) is an Indonesian beach volleyball player from Yogyakarta. Rachmawan who won the silver medal at the 2011 SEA Games with partner Dian Putra Sentosa. In a team with Koko Prasetyo Darkuncoro, they won the silver medal at the 2013 Islamic Solidarity Games. He and Darkuncoro also competed in the 2014 Asian Games. They finished in the fourth position after they lost to a Chinese pair in the bronze medal match. Rachmawan and Darkuncoro then claimed the gold medal at the 2014 Asian Beach Games in Phuket, Thailand.

In 2017, Rachmawan, alongside Mohammad Ashfiya, competed in the 2017 World Championships. They did not advance to the knockout stage after losing three matches in the group stage. At the 2018 Asian Games in Palembang, Indonesia, he and Ashfiya won the silver medal after they lost to a Qatari pair in the final.

== Achievements ==
=== Asian Games ===
Men

Year	Venue	Partner	Opponent	Score	Result	Ref
2018	Jakabaring Beach Volley Arena; Palembang, Indonesia	(Indonesia) Mohammad Ashfiya	(Qatar) Cherif Younousse (Qatar) Ahmed Tijan Janko	24–26, 17–21	Silver	

=== Asian Beach Games ===
Men

Year	Venue	Partner	Opponent	Score	Result	Ref
2012	Fengxiang Beach, Haiyang, China	(Indonesia) Koko Prasetyo Darkuncoro	(Kazakhstan) Dmitry Yakovlev (Kazakhstan) Alexey Kuleshov	22–20, 21–17	Gold	
2014	Karon Beach, Phuket, Thailand	(Indonesia) Koko Prasetyo Darkuncoro	(Iran) Saber Houshmand (Iran) Bahman Salemi	20–22, 21–14, 15–10	Gold	

=== Asian Championships ===
Men

Year	Venue	Partner	Opponent	Score	Result	Ref
2012	Haikou, China	(Indonesia) Koko Prasetyo Darkuncoro	(Iran) Parviz Farrokhi (Iran) Aghmohammad Salagh	21–18, 16–21, 15–10	Bronze	
2017	Songkhla, Thailand	(Indonesia) Mohammad Ashfiya	(Iran) Rahman Raoufi (Iran) Bahman Salemi	20–22, 21–12, 12–15	Silver	

=== Southeast Asian Championships ===
Men

Year	Venue	Partner	Opponent	Score	Result	Ref
2017	Palawan Beach, Sentosa, Singapore	(Indonesia) Mohammad Ashfiya	(Thailand) Nuttanon Inkiew (Thailand) Sedtawat Padsawud	21–19, 21–14	Gold	

=== Asian Youth Games ===
Boys

Year	Venue	Partner	Opponent	Score	Result	Ref
2009	Siloso Beach, Singapore	(Indonesia) Gede Eka Agustiawan	(Yemen) Omair (Yemen) Haidarah	21–16, 21–17	Bronze	

=== FIVB Beach Volleyball World Tour ===
Key

World Tour Finals
5-star tournament/Major Series
4-star tournament
3-star tournament
2-star tournament
1-star tournament

Year	Tournament	Partner	Opponent	Score	Result	Ref
2018	SMM Pak Bara Beach Satun	(Indonesia) Mohammad Ashfiya	(Thailand) Nuttanon Inkiew (Thailand) Sedtawat Padsawud	19–21, 16–21	(silver) Runner-up	
2018	Singapore Open presented by Neo Group	(Indonesia) Mohammad Ashfiya	(Slovenia) Neck Zemljak (Slovenia) Jan Pokeršnik	28–26, 22–20	(bronze) Third place	
