= Beach volleyball at the 2026 Asian Games – Men's tournament =

Men at the 2026 Asian Games
- Venue: Hekinan Ryokuchi Beach Court
- Dates: 20 September – 3 October 2026
- Competitors: 60 from 18 nations

Medalists
gold medal	Cherif Younousse; Ahmed Tijan	Qatar
silver medal	Sofyan Rachman Efendi; Bintang Akbar	Indonesia
bronze medal	Kota Kurosawa; Taito Mizumachi	Japan

The men's beach volleyball tournament at the 2026 Asian Games took place at the Hekinan Ryokuchi Beach Court in Hekinan, Aichi Prefecture, Japan from 20 September to 3 October 2026. Qatar's Cherif Younousse and Ahmed Tijan won the gold medal, Indonesia's Sofyan Rachman Efendi and Bintang Akbar took silver, and Japan's Kota Kurosawa and Taito Mizumachi the bronze.

== Schedule ==
All times are Japan Standard Time (UTC+09:00)

Date	Time	Event
Sunday, 20 September 2026	13:00	Preliminary round
Monday, 21 September 2026	11:00	Preliminary round
Tuesday, 22 September 2026	11:00	Preliminary round
Wednesday, 23 September 2026	11:00	Preliminary round
Thursday, 24 September 2026	11:00	Preliminary round
Friday, 25 September 2026	11:00	Preliminary round
Saturday, 26 September 2026	11:00	Preliminary round
Sunday, 27 September 2026	11:00	Preliminary round
Tuesday, 29 September 2026	09:00	Round of 16
Wednesday, 30 September 2026	11:00	Quarterfinals
Thursday, 1 October 2026	14:00	Semifinals
Saturday, 3 October 2026	12:00	Bronze medal match
Saturday, 3 October 2026	13:00	Gold medal match

== Results ==
=== Preliminary round ===
==== Pool A ====
Pos	Team	Pld	W	L	Pts	SW	SL	SR	SPW	SPL	SPR	Qualification
1	Younousse–Tijan (QAT)	2	2	0	4	4	0	MAX	84	55	1.527	Round of 16
2	Al Jalaboubi–Al-Hashimi (OMA)	2	1	1	3	2	2	1.000	87	82	1.061	Round of 16
3	Abdilla–Francisco (PHI)	2	0	2	2	0	4	0.000	57	91	0.626	

Source: OCA

Date		Score		Set 1	Set 2	Set 3
21 Sep	Younousse–Tijan (QAT)	2–0	Abdilla–Francisco (PHI)	21–7	21–10	
24 Sep	Al Jalaboubi–Al-Hashimi (OMA)	2–0	Abdilla–Francisco (PHI)	21–14	28–26	
27 Sep	Younousse–Tijan (QAT)	2–0	Al Jalaboubi–Al-Hashimi (OMA)	21–19	21–19	

==== Pool B ====
Pos	Team	Pld	W	L	Pts	SW	SL	SR	SPW	SPL	SPR	Qualification
1	Wu–Zhou (CHN)	2	2	0	4	4	1	4.000	96	71	1.352	Round of 16
2	Nguyen–Le (VIE)	2	1	1	3	3	2	1.500	87	86	1.012	Round of 16
3	Wong–Chong (HKG)	2	0	2	2	0	4	0.000	58	84	0.690	

Source: OCA

Date		Score		Set 1	Set 2	Set 3
21 Sep	Wu–Zhou (CHN)	2–1	Nguyen–Le (VIE)	21–15	18–21	15–9
24 Sep	Wong–Chong (HKG)	0–2	Nguyen–Le (VIE)	13–21	19–21	
27 Sep	Wu–Zhou (CHN)	2–0	Wong–Chong (HKG)	21–13	21–13	

==== Pool C ====
Pos	Team	Pld	W	L	Pts	SW	SL	SR	SPW	SPL	SPR	Qualification
1	Efendi–Akbar (INA)	3	3	0	6	6	0	MAX	126	71	1.775	Round of 16
2	Nguyen–Tran (VIE)	3	2	1	5	4	2	2.000	120	105	1.143	Round of 16
3	Buytrago–Rosales (PHI)	3	1	2	4	2	4	0.500	103	113	0.912	
4	Batmunkh–Bat-Enkh (MGL)	3	0	3	3	0	6	0.000	66	126	0.524	

Source: OCA

Date		Score		Set 1	Set 2	Set 3
21 Sep	Efendi–Akbar (INA)	2–0	Nguyen–Tran (VIE)	21–18	21–15	
21 Sep	Buytrago–Rosales (PHI)	2–0	Batmunkh–Bat-Enkh (MGL)	21–11	21–15	
23 Sep	Efendi–Akbar (INA)	2–0	Batmunkh–Bat-Enkh (MGL)	21–8	21–6	
23 Sep	Buytrago–Rosales (PHI)	0–2	Nguyen–Tran (VIE)	22–24	15–21	
27 Sep	Efendi–Akbar (INA)	2–0	Buytrago–Rosales (PHI)	21–11	21–13	
27 Sep	Nguyen–Tran (VIE)	2–0	Batmunkh–Bat-Enkh (MGL)	21–13	21–13	

==== Pool D ====
Pos	Team	Pld	W	L	Pts	SW	SL	SR	SPW	SPL	SPR	Qualification
1	Taovato–Tipjan (THA)	3	3	0	6	6	0	MAX	126	73	1.726	Round of 16
2	Mou–Zainelabedin (QAT)	3	2	1	5	4	3	1.333	127	105	1.210	Round of 16
3	Senarathna–Fernando (SRI)	3	1	2	4	3	4	0.750	108	115	0.939	
4	Oh–Bae (KOR)	3	0	3	3	0	6	0.000	58	126	0.460	

Source: OCA

Date		Score		Set 1	Set 2	Set 3
21 Sep	Taovato–Tipjan (THA)	2–0	Senarathna–Fernando (SRI)	21–15	21–10	
21 Sep	Mou–Zainelabedin (QAT)	2–0	Oh–Bae (KOR)	21–13	21–9	
23 Sep	Taovato–Tipjan (THA)	2–0	Oh–Bae (KOR)	21–9	21–6	
23 Sep	Mou–Zainelabedin (QAT)	2–1	Senarathna–Fernando (SRI)	21–10	16–21	15–10
26 Sep	Taovato–Tipjan (THA)	2–0	Mou–Zainelabedin (QAT)	21–14	21–19	
26 Sep	Senarathna–Fernando (SRI)	2–0	Oh–Bae (KOR)	21–11	21–10	

==== Pool E ====
Pos	Team	Pld	W	L	Pts	SW	SL	SR	SPW	SPL	SPR	Qualification
1	Bogatu–Gurin (KAZ)	3	3	0	6	6	1	6.000	142	108	1.315	Round of 16
2	Faisal–Bayhaqly (INA)	3	2	1	5	5	2	2.500	139	125	1.112	Round of 16
3	Lee–Lee (HKG)	3	1	2	4	2	4	0.500	112	117	0.957	
4	Bae–Yeo (KOR)	3	0	3	3	0	6	0.000	83	126	0.659	

Source: OCA

Date		Score		Set 1	Set 2	Set 3
20 Sep	Bogatu–Gurin (KAZ)	2–1	Faisal–Bayhaqly (INA)	22–24	21–19	15–12
20 Sep	Lee–Lee (HKG)	2–0	Bae–Yeo (KOR)	21–17	21–16	
22 Sep	Bogatu–Gurin (KAZ)	2–0	Bae–Yeo (KOR)	21–10	21–10	
22 Sep	Lee–Lee (HKG)	0–2	Faisal–Bayhaqly (INA)	18–21	19–21	
25 Sep	Bogatu–Gurin (KAZ)	2–0	Lee–Lee (HKG)	21–15	21–18	
25 Sep	Faisal–Bayhaqly (INA)	2–0	Bae–Yeo (KOR)	21–16	21–14	

==== Pool F ====
Pos	Team	Pld	W	L	Pts	SW	SL	SR	SPW	SPL	SPR	Qualification
1	Pourasgari–Aghajani (IRI)	3	3	0	6	6	0	MAX	135	88	1.534	Round of 16
2	Muadpha–Muneekul (THA)	3	2	1	5	4	2	2.000	131	109	1.202	Round of 16
3	Al-Housni–Al Mamari (OMA)	3	1	2	4	2	4	0.500	90	109	0.826	
4	Xavier–Valente (TLS)	3	0	3	3	0	6	0.000	76	126	0.603	

Source: OCA

Date		Score		Set 1	Set 2	Set 3
21 Sep	Muadpha–Muneekul (THA)	2–0	Al-Housni–Al Mamari (OMA)	21–11	21–12	
21 Sep	Pourasgari–Aghajani (IRI)	2–0	Xavier–Valente (TLS)	21–12	21–4	
23 Sep	Muadpha–Muneekul (THA)	2–0	Xavier–Valente (TLS)	21–17	21–18	
23 Sep	Pourasgari–Aghajani (IRI)	2–0	Al-Housni–Al Mamari (OMA)	21–12	21–13	
26 Sep	Muadpha–Muneekul (THA)	0–2	Pourasgari–Aghajani (IRI)	25–27	22–24	
26 Sep	Al-Housni–Al Mamari (OMA)	2–0	Xavier–Valente (TLS)	21–13	21–12	

==== Pool G ====
Pos	Team	Pld	W	L	Pts	SW	SL	SR	SPW	SPL	SPR	Qualification
1	Song–Wang (CHN)	3	3	0	6	6	0	MAX	130	64	2.031	Round of 16
2	Tachiya–Ishijima (JPN)	3	2	1	5	4	3	1.333	131	129	1.016	Round of 16
3	Dauilbaev–Tolibaev (UZB)	3	1	2	4	2	5	0.400	115	137	0.839	
4	Mokhammad–Yakovlev (KAZ)	3	0	3	3	2	6	0.333	102	148	0.689	

Source: OCA

Date		Score		Set 1	Set 2	Set 3
20 Sep	Song–Wang (CHN)	2–0	Dauilbaev–Tolibaev (UZB)	21–8	25–23	
20 Sep	Mokhammad–Yakovlev (KAZ)	1–2	Tachiya–Ishijima (JPN)	20–22	21–19	12–15
22 Sep	Song–Wang (CHN)	2–0	Tachiya–Ishijima (JPN)	21–15	21–18	
22 Sep	Mokhammad–Yakovlev (KAZ)	1–2	Dauilbaev–Tolibaev (UZB)	21–14	16–21	12–15
25 Sep	Song–Wang (CHN)	2–0	Mokhammad–Yakovlev (KAZ)	21–0	21–0	
25 Sep	Dauilbaev–Tolibaev (UZB)	0–2	Tachiya–Ishijima (JPN)	17–21	17–21	

==== Pool H ====
Pos	Team	Pld	W	L	Pts	SW	SL	SR	SPW	SPL	SPR	Qualification
1	Kurosawa–Mizumachi (JPN)	3	3	0	6	6	1	6.000	139	102	1.363	Round of 16
2	Khakizadeh–Ghalehnovi (IRI)	3	2	1	5	5	2	2.500	134	106	1.264	Round of 16
3	Shaikat–Ahmed (BAN)	3	1	2	4	2	5	0.400	102	139	0.734	
4	Adam–Ismail (MDV)	3	0	3	3	1	6	0.167	107	135	0.793	

Source: OCA

Date		Score		Set 1	Set 2	Set 3
20 Sep	Kurosawa–Mizumachi (JPN)	2–0	Shaikat–Ahmed (BAN)	21–11	21–15	
20 Sep	Khakizadeh–Ghalehnovi (IRI)	2–0	Adam–Ismail (MDV)	21–12	21–14	
22 Sep	Kurosawa–Mizumachi (JPN)	2–0	Adam–Ismail (MDV)	21–15	21–11	
22 Sep	Khakizadeh–Ghalehnovi (IRI)	2–0	Shaikat–Ahmed (BAN)	21–13	21–12	
24 Sep	Kurosawa–Mizumachi (JPN)	2–1	Khakizadeh–Ghalehnovi (IRI)	21–17	19–21	15–12
24 Sep	Shaikat–Ahmed (BAN)	2–1	Adam–Ismail (MDV)	13–21	21–19	17–15

=== Knockout round ===
Round of 16
Younousse–Tijan (QAT)	21	21
Nguyen–Tran (VIE)	9	16
Tachiya–Ishijima (JPN)	21	17	8
Pourasgari–Aghajani (IRI)	18	21	15
Bogatu–Gurin (KAZ)	21	18	15
Khakizadeh–Ghalehnovi (IRI)	15	21	11
Muadpha–Muneekul (THA)	19	16
Taovato–Tipjan (THA)	21	21
Efendi–Akbar (INA)	22	21
Al Jalaboubi–Al-Hashimi (OMA)	20	18
Mou–Zainelabedin (QAT)	13	16
Song–Wang (CHN)	21	21
Kurosawa–Mizumachi (JPN)	21	21
Nguyen–Le (VIE)	12	16
Faisal–Bayhaqly (INA)	13	11
Wu–Zhou (CHN)	21	21

Quarterfinals
Younousse–Tijan (QAT)	21	22
Pourasgari–Aghajani (IRI)	13	20
Bogatu–Gurin (KAZ)	19	13
Taovato–Tipjan (THA)	21	21
Efendi–Akbar (INA)	21	21
Song–Wang (CHN)	19	18
Kurosawa–Mizumachi (JPN)	19	21	15
Wu–Zhou (CHN)	21	13	12

Semifinals
Younousse–Tijan (QAT)	23	21
Taovato–Tipjan (THA)	21	12
Efendi–Akbar (INA)	21	21
Kurosawa–Mizumachi (JPN)	19	18

Gold medal match
Younousse–Tijan (QAT)	19	21	15
Efendi–Akbar (INA)	21	16	8
Bronze medal match
Taovato–Tipjan (THA)	18	21	12
Kurosawa–Mizumachi (JPN)	21	17	15

== Final standing ==
Rank	Team	Pld	W	L
1st place, gold medalist(s)	Cherif Younousse – Ahmed Tijan (QAT)	6	6	0
2nd place, silver medalist(s)	Sofyan Rachman Efendi – Bintang Akbar (INA)	7	6	1
3rd place, bronze medalist(s)	Kota Kurosawa – Taito Mizumachi (JPN)	7	6	1
4	Poravid Taovato – Pithak Tipjan (THA)	7	5	2
5	Wu Jiaxin (beach volleyball) – Zhou Chaowei (CHN)	4	3	1
5	Song Jinyang – Wang Yanwei (CHN)	5	4	1
5	Abbas Pourasgari – Alireza Aghajani (IRI)	5	4	1
5	Sergey Bogatu – Kirill Gurin (KAZ)	5	4	1
9	Imam Ahmad Faisal – Fairuz Bayhaqly (INA)	4	2	2
9	Abolhassan Khakizadeh – Amir Ali Ghalehnovi (IRI)	4	2	2
9	Juntaro Tachiya – Yusuke Ishijima (JPN)	4	2	2
9	Hood Al Jalaboubi – Mazin Al-Hashmi (OMA)	3	1	2
9	Musa Alkeer Mou – Mohamed Zainelabedin (QAT)	4	2	2
9	Wachirawit Muadpha – Netitorn Muneekul (THA)	4	2	2
9	Nguyễn Anh Tuấn (beach volleyball) – Lê Hoàng Y (VIE)	3	1	2
9	Nguyễn Lâm Tới – Trần Văn Việt (VIE)	4	2	2
17	Md Ali Al Murammar Rakesh Shaikat – Ratul Ahmed (BAN)	3	1	2
17	Lee Cheuk Hei – Lee Lit Fung (HKG)	3	1	2
17	Wong Pui Lam – Chong Kei Loi (HKG)	2	0	2
17	Ahmed Al-Housni – Khalfan Al Mamari (OMA)	3	1	2
17	Alnakran Abdilla – Lerry John Francisco (PHI)	2	0	2
17	James Buytrago – Ronniel Rosales (PHI)	3	1	2
17	Dileepa Chamika Senarathna – Sadun Madusanka Fernando (SRI)	3	1	2
17	Azamat Dauilbaev – Dilshodbek Tolibaev (UZB)	3	1	2
25	Abdulmajid Mokhammad – Dmitriy Yakovlev (KAZ)	3	0	3
25	Bae In-ho – Yeo Minsu (KOR)	3	0	3
25	Oh Jeongtaek – Bae Sangbin (KOR)	3	0	3
25	Adam Naseem – Ismail Sajid (MDV)	3	0	3
25	Amar Batmunkh – Shijir-erdene Bat-Enkh (MGL)	3	0	3
25	Joninho Fernandes Xavier – Joel Valente (TLS)	3	0	3
