= Beach volleyball at the 2022 Asian Games – Men's tournament =

Men at the 2022 Asian Games
- Venue: Banbianshan Beach
- Dates: 19–28 September 2023
- Competitors: 54 from 16 nations

Medalists
gold medal	Cherif Younousse; Ahmed Tijan	Qatar
silver medal	Abuduhalikejiang Mutailipu; Wu Jiaxin	China
bronze medal	Sergey Bogatu; Dmitriy Yakovlev	Kazakhstan

The men's beach volleyball tournament at the 2022 Asian Games took place at Banbianshan Beach Volleyball Centre, Ningbo, China from 19 to 28 September 2023.

== Schedule ==
All times are China Standard Time (UTC+08:00)

Date	Time	Event
Tuesday, 19 September 2023	09:00	Preliminary round
Wednesday, 20 September 2023	09:00	Preliminary round
Thursday, 21 September 2023	09:00	Preliminary round
Friday, 22 September 2023	09:00	Preliminary round
Sunday, 24 September 2023	09:00	Round of 16
Monday, 25 September 2023	12:00	Quarterfinals
Tuesday, 26 September 2023	16:10	Semifinals
Thursday, 28 September 2023	14:00	Bronze medal match
Thursday, 28 September 2023	15:00	Gold medal match

== Results ==
=== Preliminary round ===
==== Pool A ====
Pos	Team	Pld	W	L	Pts	SW	SL	SR	SPW	SPL	SPR	Qualification
1	Abuduhalikejiang–Wu (CHN)	2	2	0	4	4	1	4.000	101	79	1.278	Round of 16
2	Garcia–Buytrago (PHI)	2	1	1	3	3	2	1.500	98	82	1.195	Round of 16
3	Sajid–Naseem (MDV)	2	0	2	2	0	4	0.000	46	84	0.548	

Source: OCA

Date		Score		Set 1	Set 2	Set 3
20 Sep	Abuduhalikejiang–Wu (CHN)	2–1	Garcia–Buytrago (PHI)	21–18	20–22	18–16
21 Sep	Abuduhalikejiang–Wu (CHN)	2–0	Sajid–Naseem (MDV)	21–11	21–12	
22 Sep	Garcia–Buytrago (PHI)	2–0	Sajid–Naseem (MDV)	21–11	21–12	

==== Pool B ====
Pos	Team	Pld	W	L	Pts	SW	SL	SR	SPW	SPL	SPR	Qualification
1	Younousse–Tijan (QAT)	2	2	0	4	4	0	MAX	84	46	1.826	Round of 16
2	Pribadi–Efendi (INA)	2	1	1	3	2	1	2.000	79	87	0.908	Round of 16
3	Requinton–Abdilla (PHI)	2	0	2	2	1	4	0.250	61	91	0.670	

Source: OCA

Date		Score		Set 1	Set 2	Set 3
19 Sep	Pribadi–Efendi (INA)	2–1	Requinton–Abdilla (PHI)	13–21	21–16	15–8
20 Sep	Younousse–Tijan (QAT)	2–0	Pribadi–Efendi (INA)	21–12	21–18	
22 Sep	Younousse–Tijan (QAT)	2–0	Requinton–Abdilla (PHI)	21–9	21–7	

==== Pool C ====
Pos	Team	Pld	W	L	Pts	SW	SL	SR	SPW	SPL	SPR	Qualification
1	Taovato–Tipjan (THA)	2	2	0	4	4	0	MAX	84	56	1.500	Round of 16
2	Takahashi–Ageba (JPN)	2	1	1	3	2	2	1.000	72	65	1.108	Round of 16
3	Wong–Lam (HKG)	2	0	2	2	0	4	0.000	49	84	0.583	

Source: OCA

Date		Score		Set 1	Set 2	Set 3
19 Sep	Takahashi–Ageba (JPN)	2–0	Wong–Lam (HKG)	21–9	21–14	
20 Sep	Taovato–Tipjan (THA)	2–0	Takahashi–Ageba (JPN)	21–14	21–16	
22 Sep	Taovato–Tipjan (THA)	2–0	Wong–Lam (HKG)	21–14	21–12	

==== Pool D ====
Pos	Team	Pld	W	L	Pts	SW	SL	SR	SPW	SPL	SPR	Qualification
1	Ashfiya–Akbar (INA)	2	2	0	4	4	1	4.000	98	73	1.342	Round of 16
2	Kaewsai–Jongklang (THA)	2	1	1	3	3	2	1.500	87	87	1.000	Round of 16
3	Al-Najjar–Al-Qishawi (PLE)	2	0	2	2	0	4	0.000	59	84	0.702	

Source: OCA

Date		Score		Set 1	Set 2	Set 3
19 Sep	Ashfiya–Akbar (INA)	2–0	Al-Najjar–Al-Qishawi (PLE)	21–12	21–16	
20 Sep	Kaewsai–Jongklang (THA)	1–2	Ashfiya–Akbar (INA)	22–20	12–21	11–15
21 Sep	Kaewsai–Jongklang (THA)	2–0	Al-Najjar–Al-Qishawi (PLE)	21–12	21–19	

==== Pool E ====
Pos	Team	Pld	W	L	Pts	SW	SL	SR	SPW	SPL	SPR	Qualification
1	Wang–Li (CHN)	2	2	0	4	4	0	MAX	84	66	1.273	Round of 16
2	Aldash–Gurin (KAZ)	2	1	1	3	2	2	1.000	78	73	1.068	Round of 16
3	Al-Arqan–Qusaya (PLE)	2	0	2	2	0	4	0.000	61	84	0.726	

Source: OCA

Date		Score		Set 1	Set 2	Set 3
19 Sep	Wang–Li (CHN)	2–0	Al-Arqan–Qusaya (PLE)	21–14	21–16	
21 Sep	Aldash–Gurin (KAZ)	2–0	Al-Arqan–Qusaya (PLE)	21–15	21–16	
22 Sep	Wang–Li (CHN)	2–0	Aldash–Gurin (KAZ)	21–17	21–19	

==== Pool F ====
Pos	Team	Pld	W	L	Pts	SW	SL	SR	SPW	SPL	SPR	Qualification
1	Pourasgari–Aghajani (IRI)	3	3	0	6	6	0	MAX	126	68	1.853	Round of 16
2	Assam–Nassim (QAT)	3	2	1	5	4	2	2.000	111	79	1.405	Round of 16
3	Lee–Kim (KOR)	3	1	2	4	2	4	0.500	90	112	0.804	
4	Cheong–Wong (MAC)	3	0	3	3	0	6	0.000	58	126	0.460	

Source: OCA

Date		Score		Set 1	Set 2	Set 3
19 Sep	Pourasgari–Aghajani (IRI)	2–0	Cheong–Wong (MAC)	21–11	21–8	
19 Sep	Assam–Nassim (QAT)	2–0	Lee–Kim (KOR)	21–10	21–16	
20 Sep	Cheong–Wong (MAC)	0–2	Lee–Kim (KOR)	11–21	17–21	
20 Sep	Assam–Nassim (QAT)	0–2	Pourasgari–Aghajani (IRI)	15–21	12–21	
21 Sep	Assam–Nassim (QAT)	2–0	Cheong–Wong (MAC)	21–6	21–5	
21 Sep	Pourasgari–Aghajani (IRI)	2–0	Lee–Kim (KOR)	21–11	21–11	

==== Pool G ====
Pos	Team	Pld	W	L	Pts	SW	SL	SR	SPW	SPL	SPR	Qualification
1	Bogatu–Yakovlev (KAZ)	3	3	0	6	6	1	6.000	135	92	1.467	Round of 16
2	Al-Housni–Al-Shereiqi (OMA)	3	2	1	5	5	2	2.500	130	93	1.398	Round of 16
3	Correia–Valente (TLS)	3	1	2	4	2	4	0.500	88	113	0.779	
4	Kim–Bae (KOR)	3	0	3	3	0	6	0.000	71	126	0.563	

Source: OCA

Date		Score		Set 1	Set 2	Set 3
19 Sep	Bogatu–Yakovlev (KAZ)	2–0	Correia–Valente (TLS)	21–11	21–11	
19 Sep	Al-Housni–Al-Shereiqi (OMA)	2–0	Kim–Bae (KOR)	21–8	21–10	
20 Sep	Correia–Valente (TLS)	2–0	Kim–Bae (KOR)	21–12	21–17	
20 Sep	Al-Housni–Al-Shereiqi (OMA)	1–2	Bogatu–Yakovlev (KAZ)	16–21	21–15	9–15
21 Sep	Al-Housni–Al-Shereiqi (OMA)	2–0	Correia–Valente (TLS)	21–11	21–13	
21 Sep	Bogatu–Yakovlev (KAZ)	2–0	Kim–Bae (KOR)	21–16	21–8	

==== Pool H ====
Pos	Team	Pld	W	L	Pts	SW	SL	SR	SPW	SPL	SPR	Qualification
1	Salemi–Shokati (IRI)	3	3	0	6	6	0	MAX	126	63	2.000	Round of 16
2	Al-Jalbubi–Al-Hashmi (OMA)	3	2	1	5	4	2	2.000	112	97	1.155	Round of 16
3	Rustamzoda–Tursunov (TJK)	3	1	2	4	2	4	0.500	87	121	0.719	
4	Tam–Chan (MAC)	3	0	3	3	0	6	0.000	83	127	0.654	

Source: OCA

Date		Score		Set 1	Set 2	Set 3
19 Sep	Al-Jalbubi–Al-Hashmi (OMA)	2–0	Tam–Chan (MAC)	21–9	21–17	
20 Sep	Salemi–Shokati (IRI)	2–0	Rustamzoda–Tursunov (TJK)	21–9	21–6	
21 Sep	Tam–Chan (MAC)	0–2	Rustamzoda–Tursunov (TJK)	17–21	20–22	
21 Sep	Salemi–Shokati (IRI)	2–0	Al-Jalbubi–Al-Hashmi (OMA)	21–17	21–11	
22 Sep	Salemi–Shokati (IRI)	2–0	Tam–Chan (MAC)	21–8	21–12	
22 Sep	Al-Jalbubi–Al-Hashmi (OMA)	2–0	Rustamzoda–Tursunov (TJK)	21–15	21–14	

=== Knockout round ===
Round of 16
Abuduhalikejiang–Wu (CHN)	21	21
Pribadi–Efendi (INA)	19	18
Assam–Nassim (QAT)	12	15
Wang–Li (CHN)	21	21
Pourasgari–Aghajani (IRI)	21	21
Kaewsai–Jongklang (THA)	15	15
Garcia–Buytrago (PHI)	17	21	6
Ashfiya–Akbar (INA)	21	16	15
Taovato–Tipjan (THA)	13	21	12
Aldash–Gurin (KAZ)	21	19	15
Al-Jalbubi–Al-Hashmi (OMA)	16	17
Bogatu–Yakovlev (KAZ)	21	21
Salemi–Shokati (IRI)	21	18	15
Takahashi–Ageba (JPN)	16	21	6
Al-Housni–Al-Shereiqi (OMA)	13	11
Younousse–Tijan (QAT)	21	21

Quarterfinals
Abuduhalikejiang–Wu (CHN)	21	21
Wang–Li (CHN)	13	18
Pourasgari–Aghajani (IRI)	14	21	15
Ashfiya–Akbar (INA)	21	15	12
Aldash–Gurin (KAZ)	22	18	11
Bogatu–Yakovlev (KAZ)	20	21	15
Salemi–Shokati (IRI)	17	19
Younousse–Tijan (QAT)	21	21

Semifinals
Abuduhalikejiang–Wu (CHN)	26	21
Pourasgari–Aghajani (IRI)	24	16
Bogatu–Yakovlev (KAZ)	9	19
Younousse–Tijan (QAT)	21	21

Gold medal match
Abuduhalikejiang–Wu (CHN)	20	16
Younousse–Tijan (QAT)	22	21
Bronze medal match
Pourasgari–Aghajani (IRI)	23	28
Bogatu–Yakovlev (KAZ)	25	30

== Final standing ==
Rank	Team	Pld	W	L
1st place, gold medalist(s)	Cherif Younousse – Ahmed Tijan (QAT)	6	6	0
2nd place, silver medalist(s)	Abuduhalikejiang Mutailipu – Wu Jiaxin (CHN)	6	5	1
3rd place, bronze medalist(s)	Sergey Bogatu – Dmitriy Yakovlev (KAZ)	7	6	1
4	Abbas Pourasgari – Alireza Aghajani (IRI)	7	5	2
5	Wang Yanwei – Li Jie (CHN)	4	3	1
5	Mohammad Ashfiya – Bintang Akbar (INA)	4	3	1
5	Bahman Salemi – Sina Shokati (IRI)	5	4	1
5	Nurdos Aldash – Kirill Gurin (KAZ)	4	2	2
9	Danangsyah Pribadi – Sofyan Rachman Efendi (INA)	3	1	2
9	Takumi Takahashi – Yuya Ageba (JPN)	3	1	2
9	Ahmed Al-Housni – Haitham Al-Shereiqi (OMA)	4	2	2
9	Nouh Al-Jalbubi – Mazin Al-Hashmi (OMA)	4	2	2
9	Jude Garcia – James Buytrago (PHI)	3	1	2
9	Mahmoud Assam – Abdallah Nassim (QAT)	4	2	2
9	Dunwinit Kaewsai – Surin Jongklang (THA)	3	1	2
9	Poravid Taovato – Pithak Tipjan (THA)	3	2	1
17	Wong Pui Lam – Lam Ki Fung (HKG)	2	0	2
17	Lee Dong-seok – Kim Jun-young (KOR)	3	1	2
17	Ismail Sajid – Adam Naseem (MDV)	2	0	2
17	Jaron Requinton – Ranran Abdilla (PHI)	2	0	2
17	Taleb Al-Najjar – Mohammed Al-Qishawi (PLE)	2	0	2
17	Abdallah Al-Arqan – Ibrahim Qusaya (PLE)	2	0	2
17	Muhsini Rustamzoda – Mukhamadrasul Tursunov (TJK)	3	1	2
17	Fabricius Correia – Joel Valente (TLS)	3	1	2
25	Kim Myeong-jin – Bae In-ho (KOR)	3	0	3
25	Cheong Hou Wang – Wong Wai Hei (MAC)	3	0	3
25	Tam Chit Meng – Chan Ka Lon (MAC)	3	0	3
