= Shooting at the 2018 Asian Games – Men's 50 metre rifle three positions =

Shooting event

Men's 50 metre rifle 3 positions at the 2018 Asian Games
- Venue: Jakabaring Shooting Range
- Dates: 21 August 2018
- Competitors: 32 from 18 nations

Medalists
gold medal	Hui Zicheng	China
silver medal	Sanjeev Rajput	India
bronze medal	Takayuki Matsumoto	Japan

The men's 50 metre rifle three positions event at the 2018 Asian Games in Palembang, Indonesia took place on 21 August at the Jakabaring International Shooting Range.

== Schedule ==
All times are Western Indonesia Time (UTC+07:00)

Date	Time	Event
Tuesday, 21 August 2018	09:00	Qualification
Tuesday, 21 August 2018	13:30	Final

== Records ==
Prior to this competition, the existing world, Asian and Games records were as follows.

Qualification
World Record	Yang Haoran (CHN)	1187	Munich, Germany	24 May 2018
Asian Record	Yang Haoran (CHN)	1187	Munich, Germany	24 May 2018
Games Record	Zhu Qinan (CHN)	1171	Incheon, South Korea	27 September 2014
Final
World Record	Yang Haoran (CHN)	465.3	Munich, Germany	25 May 2018
Asian Record	Yang Haoran (CHN)	465.3	Munich, Germany	25 May 2018
Games Record	Cao Yifei (CHN)	455.5	Incheon, South Korea	27 September 2014

== Results ==
=== Qualification ===
Rank	Athlete	Kneeling				Prone				Standing				Total	Xs	Notes
Rank	Athlete	1	2	3	4	1	2	3	4	1	2	3	4	Total	Xs	Notes
1	Yang Haoran (CHN)	99	96	99	98	99	98	97	97	98	100	96	97	1174	62	GR
2	Hui Zicheng (CHN)	97	97	98	98	97	99	99	100	96	97	97	97	1172	62	
3	Napis Tortungpanich (THA)	96	95	97	98	98	100	100	97	94	96	98	95	1164	57	
4	Mahyar Sedaghat (IRI)	97	97	97	98	98	98	96	97	98	96	95	97	1164	50	
5	Thongphaphum Vongsukdee (THA)	98	98	98	97	99	99	98	99	96	95	95	92	1164	45	
6	Takayuki Matsumoto (JPN)	97	98	98	97	99	98	98	98	95	98	94	93	1163	55	
7	Sanjeev Rajput (IND)	98	99	96	96	100	100	98	98	93	95	92	95	1160	53	
8	Yuriy Yurkov (KAZ)	96	98	95	94	100	97	99	99	98	94	94	95	1159	60	
9	Cheon Min-ho (KOR)	96	95	97	99	96	98	100	97	95	96	95	95	1159	49	
10	Lutfi Othman (MAS)	94	97	97	96	100	98	98	100	94	95	94	95	1158	51	
11	Akhil Sheoran (IND)	93	95	97	97	98	99	98	98	94	97	96	96	1158	45	
12	Pouria Norouzian (IRI)	97	99	98	97	100	98	95	97	97	93	94	90	1155	48	
13	Alexey Kleimyonov (KAZ)	97	94	98	95	98	99	99	97	95	91	95	96	1154	46	
14	Ghufran Adil (PAK)	96	97	93	97	99	99	97	96	95	94	93	96	1152	43	
15	Toshikazu Yamashita (JPN)	95	96	99	98	99	97	100	98	96	91	88	94	1151	44	
16	Hamed Al-Khatri (OMA)	94	96	98	94	99	100	99	96	95	95	94	91	1151	40	
17	Mahmood Haji (BRN)	98	96	97	97	96	98	95	95	95	94	95	93	1149	43	
18	Nyantain Bayaraa (MGL)	95	97	98	95	99	99	98	99	92	90	87	96	1145	45	
19	Kim Hyeon-jun (KOR)	94	95	97	95	95	97	98	94	95	94	97	92	1143	51	
20	Jayson Valdez (PHI)	95	93	95	93	96	97	97	95	97	94	95	95	1142	38	
21	Husain Abduljabbar (BRN)	97	91	97	93	97	97	97	97	93	91	96	96	1142	34	
22	Ali Al-Muhannadi (QAT)	97	96	96	97	100	94	96	94	93	90	91	91	1135	29	
23	Nguyễn Thành Nam (VIE)	95	96	94	98	99	96	97	95	94	93	88	89	1134	35	
24	Dwi Firmansyah (INA)	92	97	92	93	96	97	98	98	93	94	91	92	1133	27	
25	Zeeshan Farid (PAK)	93	95	94	97	93	96	94	96	93	95	94	92	1132	36	
26	Issam Al-Balushi (OMA)	89	97	94	96	97	96	93	95	90	95	95	95	1132	35	
27	Nguyễn Duy Hoàng (VIE)	93	93	93	94	91	96	98	99	93	94	90	95	1129	33	
28	Shovon Chowdhury (BAN)	93	91	93	94	95	97	96	95	96	92	94	89	1125	32	
29	Robiul Islam (BAN)	94	94	96	90	93	97	99	96	92	94	91	89	1125	30	
30	Sahurun Sasak (INA)	89	91	95	94	98	99	96	97	93	89	90	93	1124	32	
31	Mohamed Abdulla (MDV)	95	95	92	94	95	97	98	97	90	84	89	90	1116	33	
32	Ibrahim Ahmed (MDV)	82	82	92	79	93	98	95	97	83	84	84	91	1060	22	

=== Final ===
Rank	Athlete	Kneeling			Prone			Standing – Elimination							S-off	Notes
Rank	Athlete	1	2	3	1	2	3	1	2	3	4	5	6	7	S-off	Notes
1st place, gold medalist(s)	Hui Zicheng (CHN)	47.7	99.1	150.7	200.4	249.6	301.1	350.6	402.5	412.5	422.2	432.8	443.2	453.3		
2nd place, silver medalist(s)	Sanjeev Rajput (IND)	51.3	103.0	151.2	202.6	254.3	307.1	355.6	402.8	411.2	421.4	431.7	442.3	452.7		
3rd place, bronze medalist(s)	Takayuki Matsumoto (JPN)	50.1	99.8	151.1	200.6	251.9	303.9	351.2	400.0	410.5	420.8	431.2	441.4			
4	Yang Haoran (CHN)	48.4	98.4	149.3	200.0	252.2	304.1	354.5	402.5	412.7	422.3	431.1				
5	Yuriy Yurkov (KAZ)	49.6	101.6	151.7	202.2	253.1	303.6	351.7	398.2	408.6	418.8					
6	Mahyar Sedaghat (IRI)	50.9	99.1	149.1	198.8	248.0	298.4	346.3	396.0	406.0						
7	Napis Tortungpanich (THA)	49.4	99.0	146.3	198.0	250.2	301.5	351.2	396.0						SO	
8	Thongphaphum Vongsukdee (THA)	48.7	98.6	150.4	198.9	248.9	298.7	344.0	394.7							
