= Đoàn Thị Xuân =

Vietnamese volleyball player

Personal information
- Full name: Đoàn Thị Xuân
- Nationality: Vietnam
- Born: May 17, 1997 (age 29) Thanh Hóa, Vietnam
- Height: 1.83 m (6 ft 0 in)
- Weight: 65 kg (143 lb)
- Spike: 300 cm (9 ft 10 in)
- Block: 292 cm (9 ft 7 in)

Volleyball information
- Position: Opposite spiker
- Current club: (Vietnam) Thanh Hóa VC
- Number: 17 (National team); 97 (Club)

Career
- Years: Team
- 2010–2011: (Vietnam) Vietsov Petro
- 2012–2018, 2020, 2025: (Vietnam) Vietinbank VC
- 2021–2023: (Vietnam) Than Quảng Ninh VC
- 2023: (Vietnam) Sport Center 1 (selected team)
- 2024–present: (Vietnam) Thanh Hóa VC
- 2024: (Vietnam) Đức Giang Chemical (loan)
- 2026: (Vietnam) Hà Nội Tasco Auto (loan)

National team
- Years: Team
- 2016–2017, 2022–2023, 2026: Vietnam
Honours
Women's volleyball
Representing Vietnam
AVC Cup
Gold medal – first place	2023 Gresik	Team
Bronze medal – third place	2026 Candon	Team
Southeast Asian Games
Silver medal – second place	2023 Phnom Penh	Team
Bronze medal – third place	2017 Kuala Lumpur	Team
SEA V.League
Silver medal – second place	2022 Nakhon Ratchasima	Team
Silver medal – second place	2023 Vĩnh Phúc / Chiang Mai	Team

Đoàn Thị Xuân (born May 17, 1997) is a Vietnamese volleyball player. She is a member of Vietnam women's national volleyball team and Thanh Hóa volleyball club.

== Clubs ==
- (Vietnam) Vietsov Petro (2010 – 2011)
- (Vietnam) Vietinbank VC (2012 – 2018, 2020, 2025)
- (Vietnam) Than Quảng Ninh VC (2021 – 2023)
- (Vietnam) Sport Center 1 (2023) (selected team)
- (Vietnam) Thanh Hóa VC (2024 – )
- (Vietnam) Đức Giang Chemical (2024) (loan)
- (Vietnam) Hà Nội Tasco Auto (2026) (loan)

== Career ==
=== National teams ===
- 2016 Asian Cup — 7th Place
- 2017 Asian Championship — 5th Place
- 2017 SEA Games — Bronze Medal
- 2022 Asian Cup — 4th Place
- 2022 ASEAN Grand Prix — Runner-up
- 2023 SEA Games — Silver Medal
- 2023 Asian Challenge Cup — Champion
- 2023 FIVB Challenger Cup — 8th Place
- 2023 SEA V.League — Runner-up
- 2023 Asian Championship — 4th Place
- 2022 Asian Games — 4th Place
- 2026 AVC Cup — 3rd Place
- 2026 SEA V Cup – Second Leg — 4th Place

=== Clubs ===
- 2014 Vietnam League – 3rd Place, with Vietinbank VC
- 2015 Vietnam League – Runner-up, with Vietinbank VC
- 2016 Vietnam League – Champion, with Vietinbank VC
- 2017 Vietnam League – 3rd Place, with Vietinbank VC
- 2021 Vietnam League – 3rd Place, with Than Quảng Ninh VC
- 2023 Asian Club Championship – Champion, with Sport Center 1

== Awards ==
- 2023 SEA V.League – Second Leg "Best middle blocker"
