= Volleyball at the 2019 SEA Games =

Volleyball Event

- Pictograms for indoor (left) and beach volleyball (right)
- Venue: Subic Tennis Center (Beach); PhilSports Arena (Indoor)
- Location: Olongapo and Pasig, Philippines
- Dates: 28 November – 10 December
- Competitors: 197 from 9 nations

Volleyball at the 2019 SEA Games in the Philippines were held from 28 November to 10 December 2019. The 2019 Games featured competitions in four events.

== Participating nations ==
A total of 197 athletes from 9 nations participated (the numbers of athletes are shown in parentheses).

- Indonesia (36)
- Thailand (36)
- Philippines (34)
- Vietnam (32)
- Singapore (22)
- Cambodia (13)
- Myanmar (12)
- Malaysia (8)
- Timor-Leste (4)

== Competition schedule ==
Indoor volleyball events were held from 2 to 10 December 2019, while beach volleyball events were held from 29 November to 5 December 2019.

P	Preliminaries	½	Semifinals	5	5th place play-off	B	3rd place play-off	F	Final

Event	Mon 2	Tue 3	Wed 4	Thu 5	Fri 6	Sat 7	Sun 8	Mon 9		Tue 10		
Men	P		P		P		½			5	B	F
Women		P		P		P		B	F			

== Venues ==
The PhilSports Arena at the PhilSports Complex hosted indoor volleyball. PhilSports Arena was chosen as venue for indoor volleyball but the plan was originally revised to give way to host gymnastics events which needed a bigger venue than volleyball at the Ninoy Aquino Stadium. However, it was later reverted to PhilSports Arena during the announcement of the volleyball draw.

== Indoor volleyball ==
=== Men's tournament ===
The tournament featured 7 countries. The format was the same as 2017; there was a group of three or four with round-robin format. The top two of group played in the semifinal round. The winners of the semifinal round played for the gold medal and the losers played for the bronze.

Rank	Team	Pld	W	L
1st place, gold medalist(s)	Indonesia	5	5	0
2nd place, silver medalist(s)	Philippines	5	3	2
3rd place, bronze medalist(s)	Thailand	4	3	1
4	Myanmar	4	1	3
5	Vietnam	5	2	3
6	Cambodia	4	1	3
7	Singapore	3	0	3

=== Women's tournament ===
The tournament featured 4 countries. There was a group of four with round-robin format. The top two of group played for the gold medal and the third and fourth place of group played for the bronze medal.

Rank	Team	Pld	W	L
1st place, gold medalist(s)	Thailand	4	4	0
2nd place, silver medalist(s)	Vietnam	4	2	2
3rd place, bronze medalist(s)	Indonesia	4	2	2
4	Philippines	4	0	4

== Beach volleyball ==
=== Men's tournament ===
The tournament featured 8 countries separated into 2 Pools with round robin format. Each country has 2 pairs of players playing in a best of 3 set match. The top two of group played in the semifinal round. The winners of the semifinal round played for the gold medal and the losers played for the bronze.

== Medalists ==
Event	Gold	Silver	Bronze
Men's indoor volleyball	Indonesia (INA); Agil Angga Anggara; Bastian Tamtomo Putro; Dimas Saputra Pratama; Dio Zulfikri; Doni Haryono; Fahreza Rakha Abhinaya; Hadi Suharto; Hernanda Zulfi; I Putu Randu Wahyu Pradana; Nizar Julfikar Munawar; Rendy Febriant Tamamilang; Rivan Nurmulki; Sigit Ardian; Yuda Mardiansyah Putra	Philippines (PHI); Ranran Abdilla; Mark Alfafara; Bryan Bagunas; John Vic De Guzman; Marck Espejo; Rex Intal; Jack Kalingking; Jessie Lopez; Kim Malabunga; Ricky Marcos; Esmilzo Polvorosa; Ave Retamar; Francis Saura; Joshua Umandal	Thailand (THA); Saranchit Charoensuk; Amorntep Konhan; Kantapat Koonmee; Mawin Maneewong; Kittinon Namkhunthod; Kissada Nilsawai; Kittithad Nuwaddee; Anuchit Pakdeekaew; Montri Puanglib; Anut Promchan; Jakraprop Saengsee; Kitsada Somkane; Jakkapong Tongklang; Boonyarid Wongtorn
Women's indoor volleyball	Thailand (THA); Wilavan Apinyapong; Tichakorn Boonlert; Pornpun Guedpard; Malika Kanthong; Pimpichaya Kokram; Ajcharaporn Kongyot; Chatchu-on Moksri; Watchareeya Nuanjam; Thatdao Nuekjang; Piyanut Pannoy; Yupa Sanitklang; Onuma Sittirak; Pleumjit Thinkaow; Nootsara Tomkom	Vietnam (VIE); Bùi Thị Ngà; Đặng Thị Kim Thanh; Đoàn Thị Lâm Oanh; Hoàng Thị Kiều Trinh; Lê Thị Hồng; Lê Thị Yến; Lưu Thị Huệ; Nguyễn Thị Kim Liên; Nguyễn Thị Trinh; Nguyễn Thị Xuân; Nguyễn Thu Hoài; Trần Thị Bích Thủy; Trần Thị Thanh Thúy; Trần Tú Linh	Indonesia (INA); Agustin Wulandari; Amalia Fajrina Nabila; Arsela Nuari Purnama; Dita Aziizah; Hany Budiarti; Megawati Hangestri Pertiwi; Novia Andriyanti; Ratri Wulandari; Shella Bernadetha Onnan; Tisya Amalya Putri; Tri Retno Mutiara Lutfi; Wilda Siti Nurfadhilah Sugandi; Wintang Dyah Kumala Sakti; Yulis Indahyani
Men's beach volleyball team	Indonesia (INA); Ade Candra Rachmawan; Mohammad Ashfiya; Gilang Ramadhan; Danangsyah Yudistira Pribadi	Thailand (THA); Surin Jongklang; Banlue Nakarkhong; Nuttanon Inkiew; Sedtawat Padsawud	Philippines (PHI); Edmar Bonono; Jude Garcia; Jaron Requinton; James Buytrago
Women's beach volleyball team	Thailand (THA); Tanarattha Udomchavee; Rumpaipruet Numwong; Khanittha Hongpak; Varapatsorn Radarong	Indonesia (INA); Dhita Juliana; Putu Dini Jasita Utami; Desi Ratnasari; Alyssah Mutakharah	Philippines (PHI); Sisi Rondina; Bernadeth Pons; Dzi Gervacio; Dij Rodriguez

== Medal table ==
Rank	Nation	Gold	Silver	Bronze	Total
1	Indonesia (INA)	2	1	1	4
1	Thailand (THA)	2	1	1	4
3	Philippines (PHI)	0	1	2	3
4	Vietnam (VIE)	0	1	0	1
Totals (4 entries)		4	4	4	12
