= Tennis at the 2018 Asian Games – Women's singles =

Women's singles at the 2018 Asian Games
- Venue: Jakabaring Tennis Court
- Dates: 19–24 August 2018
- Competitors: 37 from 20 nations

Medalists
gold medal	Wang Qiang	China
silver medal	Zhang Shuai	China
bronze medal	Ankita Raina	India
bronze medal	Liang En-shuo	Chinese Taipei

Women's singles
- Tennis at the 2018 Asian Games

Events
Singles	men	women
Doubles	men	women	mixed
Asian Games

The women's singles tennis event at the 2018 Asian Games took place at the Tennis Court of Jakabaring Sport City, Palembang, Indonesia from 19 to 24 August 2018.

Wang Qiang was the defending champion and successfully defended her title defeated compatriot Zhang Shuai in the final. Ankita Raina and Liang En-shuo won the bronze medals.

== Schedule ==
All times are Western Indonesia Time (UTC+07:00)

Date	Time	Event
Sunday, 19 August 2018	10:00	Round of 64
Monday, 20 August 2018	10:00	Round of 32
Tuesday, 21 August 2018	10:00	Round of 16
Wednesday, 22 August 2018	10:00	Quarterfinals
Thursday, 23 August 2018	10:00	Semifinals
Friday, 24 August 2018	10:00	Final

== Results ==
Legend

- WO — Won by walkover

=== Finals ===
Semifinals				Final
1	Zhang Shuai (CHN)	6	7^{8}
6	Ankita Raina (IND)	4	6^{6}	1	Zhang Shuai (CHN)	3	2
11	Liang En-shuo (TPE)	1	3	2	Wang Qiang (CHN)	6	6
2	Wang Qiang (CHN)	6	6

=== Top half ===
==== Section 1 ====
Round of 64
Anika Seneviratne (SRI)	6	6
Erdenebilegiin Ariun-Erdene (MGL)	1	2

Round of 32
1	Zhang Shuai (CHN)	6	6
Anika Seneviratne (SRI)	1	2
Ghazal Pakbaten (IRI)	0	4
15	Fatma Al-Nabhani (OMA)	6	6
12	Nigina Abduraimova (UZB)	0	6	6
Anna Danilina (KAZ)	6	2	2
Savanna Lý-Nguyễn (VIE)	2	1
8	Han Na-lae (KOR)	6	6

Round of 16
1	Zhang Shuai (CHN)	7^{7}	6
15	Fatma Al-Nabhani (OMA)	6^{5}	1
12	Nigina Abduraimova (UZB)	2	2
8	Han Na-lae (KOR)	6	6

Quarterfinals
1	Zhang Shuai (CHN)	6	6
8	Han Na-lae (KOR)	3	3

==== Section 2 ====
Round of 64
Mayanka Rana (NEP)	0	1
Eudice Chong (HKG)	6	6
Zeina Abdul Rasheed (MDV)	0	0
Beatrice Gumulya (INA)	6	6

Round of 32
3	Luksika Kumkhum (THA)	6	6^{6}	6^{1}
Eudice Chong (HKG)	4	7^{8}	7^{7}
Ushna Suhail (PAK)	3	1
14	Chang Kai-chen (TPE)	6	6
9	Eri Hozumi (JPN)	6	6
Marian Capadocia (PHI)	1	3
Beatrice Gumulya (INA)	2	4
6	Ankita Raina (IND)	6	6

Round of 16
Eudice Chong (HKG)	6	6
14	Chang Kai-chen (TPE)	0	2
9	Eri Hozumi (JPN)	1	2
6	Ankita Raina (IND)	6	6

Quarterfinals
Eudice Chong (HKG)	4	1
6	Ankita Raina (IND)	6	6

=== Bottom half ===
==== Section 3 ====
Round of 64
Csilla Fodor (VIE)	6	6
Mahika Rana (NEP)	0	1

Round of 32
7	Karman Thandi (IND)	6	6
Altansarnaigiin Jargal (MGL)	1	0
Sara Mansoor (PAK)	1	0
11	Liang En-shuo (TPE)	6	6
13	Zhang Ling (HKG)	W	O
Ksenia Palkina (KGZ)
Csilla Fodor (VIE)	5	3
4	Sabina Sharipova (UZB)	7	6

Round of 16
7	Karman Thandi (IND)	6	4	6^{4}
11	Liang En-shuo (TPE)	2	6	7^{7}
13	Zhang Ling (HKG)	7	3	7
4	Sabina Sharipova (UZB)	5	6	5

Quarterfinals
11	Liang En-shuo (TPE)	6	6
13	Zhang Ling (HKG)	2	0

==== Section 4 ====
Round of 64
Jeong Su-nam (KOR)	6	6
Sadaf Sadegh-Vaziri (IRI)	0	0

Round of 32
5	Miyu Kato (JPN)	6	6
Anjalika Kurera (SRI)	0	1
Aldila Sutjiadi (INA)	3	6	6
10	Peangtarn Plipuech (THA)	6	4	4
16	Gozal Ainitdinova (KAZ)	6	6
Ayani Moosa Kaleem (MDV)	0	0
Jeong Su-nam (KOR)	4	1
2	Wang Qiang (CHN)	6	6

Round of 16
5	Miyu Kato (JPN)	1	0
Aldila Sutjiadi (INA)	6	6
16	Gozal Ainitdinova (KAZ)	2	4
2	Wang Qiang (CHN)	6	6

Quarterfinals
Aldila Sutjiadi (INA)	4	3
2	Wang Qiang (CHN)	6	6
