= Gilang Ramadhan =

Indonesian beach volleyball player (born 1995)

Personal information
- Nationality: Indonesian
- Born: 10 February 1995 (age 31); Bandar Lampung, Indonesia
- Height: 1.88 m (6 ft 2 in)
- Weight: 75 kg (165 lb)

Beach volleyball information
Teammate
Danangsyah Pribadi
Honours
Men's beach volleyball
Representing Indonesia
Asian Games
Bronze medal – third place	2018 Jakarta-Palembang	Men
AVC Continental Cup
Silver medal – second place	2020 Nakhon Pathom	Men
Southeast Asian Games
Gold medal – first place	2019 Philippines	Men
Gold medal – first place	2021 Vietnam	Men
Gold medal – first place	2023 Cambodia	Men

Gilang Ramadhan (born 10 February 1995) is an Indonesian beach volleyball player from Bandar Lampung. Ramadhan was a gold medalist at the 2016 Pekan Olahraga Nasional held in Bandung, West Java, partnered with Ade Candra Rachmawan. He and Rachmawan also competed at the 2016 Asian Beach Games in Da Nang, Vietnam, finish in the fourth position after lost to Kazakhstani duo in the bronze medal match. In 2018, Ramadhan alongside Danangsyah Pribadi won a bronze medal at the 2018 Asian Games in Palembang, Indonesia.
