= Beach volleyball at the 2018 Asian Games – Men's tournament =

Asian Games competition

Men at the 2018 Asian Games
- Venue: Jakabaring Beach Volley Arena
- Dates: 19–28 August 2018
- Competitors: 64 from 19 nations

Medalists
gold medal	Cherif Younousse; Ahmed Tijan	Qatar
silver medal	Ade Candra Rachmawan; Mohammad Ashfiya	Indonesia
bronze medal	Gilang Ramadhan; Danangsyah Pribadi	Indonesia

The men's beach volleyball tournament at the 2018 Asian Games took place at the JSC Beach Volley Arena, Palembang, Indonesia from 19 to 28 August 2018.

== Schedule ==
All times are Western Indonesia Time (UTC+07:00)

Date	Time	Event
Sunday, 19 August 2018	09:00	Preliminary round
Monday, 20 August 2018	09:00	Preliminary round
Tuesday, 21 August 2018	09:00	Preliminary round
Wednesday, 22 August 2018	14:00	Preliminary round
Thursday, 23 August 2018	09:00	Preliminary round
Friday, 24 August 2018	13:30	Round of 16
Saturday, 25 August 2018	10:00	Quarterfinals
Sunday, 26 August 2018	10:00	Semifinals
Tuesday, 28 August 2018	15:00	Bronze medal match
Tuesday, 28 August 2018	16:00	Gold medal match

== Results ==
=== Preliminary round ===
==== Pool A ====
Pos	Team	Pld	W	L	Pts	SW	SL	SR	SPW	SPL	SPR	Qualification
1	Rachmawan–Ashfiya (INA)	3	3	0	6	6	0	MAX	126	78	1.615	Round of 16
2	Al-Shereiqi–Al-Housni (OMA)	3	2	1	5	4	3	1.333	126	111	1.135	Round of 16
3	Wang–Hsieh (TPE)	3	1	2	4	3	4	0.750	127	116	1.095	
4	Ahmadi–Asifi (AFG)	3	0	3	3	0	6	0.000	52	126	0.413	

Source: OCA

Date		Score		Set 1	Set 2	Set 3
19 Aug	Rachmawan–Ashfiya (INA)	2–0	Ahmadi–Asifi (AFG)	21–8	21–7	
19 Aug	Al-Shereiqi–Al-Housni (OMA)	2–1	Wang–Hsieh (TPE)	16–21	22–20	15–12
20 Aug	Ahmadi–Asifi (AFG)	0–2	Wang–Hsieh (TPE)	9–21	12–21	
21 Aug	Rachmawan–Ashfiya (INA)	2–0	Al-Shereiqi–Al-Housni (OMA)	21–19	21–12	
22 Aug	Al-Shereiqi–Al-Housni (OMA)	2–0	Ahmadi–Asifi (AFG)	21–4	21–12	
23 Aug	Rachmawan–Ashfiya (INA)	2–0	Wang–Hsieh (TPE)	21–16	21–16	

==== Pool B ====
Pos	Team	Pld	W	L	Pts	SW	SL	SR	SPW	SPL	SPR	Qualification
1	Younousse–Tijan (QAT)	3	3	0	6	6	0	MAX	126	73	1.726	Round of 16
2	Bogatu–Yakovlev (KAZ)	3	2	1	5	4	2	2.000	112	92	1.217	Round of 16
3	Kumara–Yapa (SRI)	3	1	2	4	2	4	0.500	97	111	0.874	
4	Kim–Kim (KOR)	3	0	3	3	0	6	0.000	67	126	0.532	

Source: OCA

Date		Score		Set 1	Set 2	Set 3
19 Aug	Bogatu–Yakovlev (KAZ)	2–0	Kumara–Yapa (SRI)	23–21	21–11	
20 Aug	Younousse–Tijan (QAT)	2–0	Bogatu–Yakovlev (KAZ)	21–9	21–17	
20 Aug	Kim–Kim (KOR)	0–2	Kumara–Yapa (SRI)	15–21	10–21	
21 Aug	Younousse–Tijan (QAT)	2–0	Kim–Kim (KOR)	21–9	21–15	
22 Aug	Bogatu–Yakovlev (KAZ)	2–0	Kim–Kim (KOR)	21–8	21–10	
23 Aug	Kumara–Yapa (SRI)	0–2	Younousse–Tijan (QAT)	12–21	11–21	

==== Pool C ====
Pos	Team	Pld	W	L	Pts	SW	SL	SR	SPW	SPL	SPR	Qualification
1	Gao–Li (CHN)	3	3	0	6	6	0	MAX	126	69	1.826	Round of 16
2	Kuleshov–Babichev (KAZ)	3	2	1	5	4	2	2.000	111	112	0.991	Round of 16
3	Nordin–Saifuddin (MAS)	3	1	2	4	2	5	0.400	127	138	0.920	
4	Hsu–Wu (TPE)	3	0	3	3	1	6	0.167	100	145	0.690	

Source: OCA

Date		Score		Set 1	Set 2	Set 3
19 Aug	Gao–Li (CHN)	2–0	Hsu–Wu (TPE)	21–11	21–10	
20 Aug	Nordin–Saifuddin (MAS)	0–2	Kuleshov–Babichev (KAZ)	23–25	18–21	
21 Aug	Gao–Li (CHN)	2–0	Nordin–Saifuddin (MAS)	21–16	21–9	
21 Aug	Hsu–Wu (TPE)	0–2	Kuleshov–Babichev (KAZ)	13–21	16–21	
22 Aug	Nordin–Saifuddin (MAS)	2–1	Hsu–Wu (TPE)	21–15	25–27	15–8
23 Aug	Kuleshov–Babichev (KAZ)	0–2	Gao–Li (CHN)	7–21	16–21	

==== Pool D ====
Pos	Team	Pld	W	L	Pts	SW	SL	SR	SPW	SPL	SPR	Qualification
1	Al-Jalbubi–Al-Hashmi (OMA)	3	3	0	6	6	0	MAX	126	77	1.636	Round of 16
2	Inkiew–Padsawud (THA)	3	2	1	5	4	2	2.000	114	90	1.267	Round of 16
3	Yeung–Chui (HKG)	3	1	2	4	2	4	0.500	93	113	0.823	
4	Adam–Mohamed (MDV)	3	0	3	3	0	6	0.000	73	126	0.579	

Source: OCA

Date		Score		Set 1	Set 2	Set 3
19 Aug	Inkiew–Padsawud (THA)	2–0	Adam–Mohamed (MDV)	21–7	21–15	
20 Aug	Al-Jalbubi–Al-Hashmi (OMA)	2–0	Yeung–Chui (HKG)	21–10	21–15	
21 Aug	Inkiew–Padsawud (THA)	0–2	Al-Jalbubi–Al-Hashmi (OMA)	19–21	11–21	
22 Aug	Adam–Mohamed (MDV)	0–2	Yeung–Chui (HKG)	17–21	12–21	
23 Aug	Al-Jalbubi–Al-Hashmi (OMA)	2–0	Adam–Mohamed (MDV)	21–9	21–13	
23 Aug	Yeung–Chui (HKG)	0–2	Inkiew–Padsawud (THA)	14–21	12–21	

==== Pool E ====
Pos	Team	Pld	W	L	Pts	SW	SL	SR	SPW	SPL	SPR	Qualification
1	Abuduhalikejiang–Wu (CHN)	3	3	0	6	6	0	MAX	127	75	1.693	Round of 16
2	Ageba–Shiratori (JPN)	3	2	1	5	4	2	2.000	119	106	1.123	Round of 16
3	Nguyễn–Phạm (VIE)	3	1	2	4	2	4	0.500	104	109	0.954	
4	Alikhail–Mayar (AFG)	3	0	3	3	0	6	0.000	66	126	0.524	

Source: OCA

Date		Score		Set 1	Set 2	Set 3
19 Aug	Abuduhalikejiang–Wu (CHN)	2–0	Alikhail–Mayar (AFG)	21–4	21–10	
19 Aug	Ageba–Shiratori (JPN)	2–0	Nguyễn–Phạm (VIE)	21–18	21–18	
20 Aug	Abuduhalikejiang–Wu (CHN)	2–0	Ageba–Shiratori (JPN)	21–15	22–20	
21 Aug	Alikhail–Mayar (AFG)	0–2	Nguyễn–Phạm (VIE)	8–21	17–21	
22 Aug	Ageba–Shiratori (JPN)	2–0	Alikhail–Mayar (AFG)	21–12	21–15	
23 Aug	Nguyễn–Phạm (VIE)	0–2	Abuduhalikejiang–Wu (CHN)	13–21	13–21	

==== Pool F ====
Pos	Team	Pld	W	L	Pts	SW	SL	SR	SPW	SPL	SPR	Qualification
1	Salemi–Vakili (IRI)	3	3	0	6	6	1	6.000	139	116	1.198	Round of 16
2	Jongklang–Khaolumtarn (THA)	3	2	1	5	4	2	2.000	119	105	1.133	Round of 16
3	Abdelrasoul–Sammoud (QAT)	3	1	2	4	3	5	0.600	137	144	0.951	
4	Sajid–Abdul Wahid (MDV)	3	0	3	3	1	6	0.167	105	135	0.778	

Source: OCA

Date		Score		Set 1	Set 2	Set 3
19 Aug	Jongklang–Khaolumtarn (THA)	2–0	Abdelrasoul–Sammoud (QAT)	21–17	21–16	
20 Aug	Jongklang–Khaolumtarn (THA)	0–2	Salemi–Vakili (IRI)	17–21	18–21	
20 Aug	Abdelrasoul–Sammoud (QAT)	2–1	Sajid–Abdul Wahid (MDV)	21–18	15–21	15–8
21 Aug	Salemi–Vakili (IRI)	2–0	Sajid–Abdul Wahid (MDV)	21–11	21–17	
22 Aug	Salemi–Vakili (IRI)	2–1	Abdelrasoul–Sammoud (QAT)	17–21	21–17	17–15
23 Aug	Sajid–Abdul Wahid (MDV)	0–2	Jongklang–Khaolumtarn (THA)	16–21	14–21	

==== Pool G ====
Pos	Team	Pld	W	L	Pts	SW	SL	SR	SPW	SPL	SPR	Qualification
1	Ramadhan–Pribadi (INA)	3	3	0	6	6	0	MAX	127	78	1.628	Round of 16
2	Al-Qishawi–Al-Arqan (PLE)	3	2	1	5	4	2	2.000	108	69	1.565	Round of 16
3	Hossain–Ali (BAN)	3	1	2	4	2	4	0.500	88	84	1.048	
4	Wong–Lau (HKG)	3	0	3	3	0	6	0.000	35	127	0.276	

Source: OCA

Date		Score		Set 1	Set 2	Set 3
19 Aug	Ramadhan–Pribadi (INA)	2–0	Wong–Lau (HKG)	22–20	21–15	
20 Aug	Al-Qishawi–Al-Arqan (PLE)	2–0	Hossain–Ali (BAN)	21–11	21–16	
21 Aug	Ramadhan–Pribadi (INA)	2–0	Al-Qishawi–Al-Arqan (PLE)	21–11	21–13	
21 Aug	Wong–Lau (HKG)	0–2	Hossain–Ali (BAN)	Walkover		
22 Aug	Wong–Lau (HKG)	0–2	Al-Qishawi–Al-Arqan (PLE)	Walkover		
23 Aug	Ramadhan–Pribadi (INA)	2–0	Hossain–Ali (BAN)	21–9	21–10	

==== Pool H ====
Pos	Team	Pld	W	L	Pts	SW	SL	SR	SPW	SPL	SPR	Qualification
1	Raoufi–Mirzaali (IRI)	3	3	0	6	6	1	6.000	140	103	1.359	Round of 16
2	Shimizu–Hasegawa (JPN)	3	2	1	5	5	2	2.500	138	112	1.232	Round of 16
3	Lý–Nguyễn (VIE)	3	1	2	4	2	4	0.500	102	112	0.911	
4	Xavier–Xavier (TLS)	3	0	3	3	0	6	0.000	73	126	0.579	

Source: OCA

Date		Score		Set 1	Set 2	Set 3
19 Aug	Shimizu–Hasegawa (JPN)	2–0	Lý–Nguyễn (VIE)	21–16	21–17	
20 Aug	Raoufi–Mirzaali (IRI)	2–0	Xavier–Xavier (TLS)	21–12	21–10	
21 Aug	Xavier–Xavier (TLS)	0–2	Lý–Nguyễn (VIE)	17–21	11–21	
22 Aug	Raoufi–Mirzaali (IRI)	2–1	Shimizu–Hasegawa (JPN)	20–22	21–19	15–13
23 Aug	Lý–Nguyễn (VIE)	0–2	Raoufi–Mirzaali (IRI)	15–21	12–21	
23 Aug	Shimizu–Hasegawa (JPN)	2–0	Xavier–Xavier (TLS)	21–10	21–13	

=== Knockout round ===
Round of 16
Rachmawan–Ashfiya (INA)	21	21
Jongklang–Khaolumtarn (THA)	17	18
Shimizu–Hasegawa (JPN)	15	21	13
Abuduhalikejiang–Wu (CHN)	21	18	15
Ramadhan–Pribadi (INA)	18	21	15
Bogatu–Yakovlev (KAZ)	21	13	12
Al-Qishawi–Al-Arqan (PLE)	11	17
Al-Jalbubi–Al-Hashmi (OMA)	21	21
Gao–Li (CHN)	18	21	17
Al-Shereiqi–Al-Housni (OMA)	21	18	15
Inkiew–Padsawud (THA)	18	16
Raoufi–Mirzaali (IRI)	21	21
Salemi–Vakili (IRI)	21	21
Ageba–Shiratori (JPN)	18	15
Kuleshov–Babichev (KAZ)	8	19
Younousse–Tijan (QAT)	21	21

Quarterfinals
Rachmawan–Ashfiya (INA)	21	19	15
Abuduhalikejiang–Wu (CHN)	16	21	7
Ramadhan–Pribadi (INA)	21	21
Al-Jalbubi–Al-Hashmi (OMA)	16	16
Gao–Li (CHN)	21	21
Raoufi–Mirzaali (IRI)	15	17
Salemi–Vakili (IRI)	16	21	11
Younousse–Tijan (QAT)	21	18	15

Semifinals
Rachmawan–Ashfiya (INA)	21	21
Ramadhan–Pribadi (INA)	13	19
Gao–Li (CHN)	18	24
Younousse–Tijan (QAT)	21	26

Gold medal match
Rachmawan–Ashfiya (INA)	24	17
Younousse–Tijan (QAT)	26	21
Bronze medal match
Ramadhan–Pribadi (INA)	21	19	15
Gao–Li (CHN)	15	21	6

== Final standing ==
Rank	Team	Pld	W	L
1st place, gold medalist(s)	Cherif Younousse – Ahmed Tijan (QAT)	7	7	0
2nd place, silver medalist(s)	Ade Candra Rachmawan – Mohammad Ashfiya (INA)	7	6	1
3rd place, bronze medalist(s)	Gilang Ramadhan – Danangsyah Pribadi (INA)	7	6	1
4	Gao Peng – Li Yang (CHN)	7	5	2
5	Abuduhalikejiang Mutailipu – Wu Jiaxin (CHN)	5	4	1
5	Rahman Raoufi – Abdolhamed Mirzaali (IRI)	5	4	1
5	Bahman Salemi – Arash Vakili (IRI)	5	4	1
5	Nouh Al-Jalbubi – Mazin Al-Hashmi (OMA)	5	4	1
9	Yuya Ageba – Katsuhiro Shiratori (JPN)	4	2	2
9	Keisuke Shimizu – Yoshiumi Hasegawa (JPN)	4	2	2
9	Sergey Bogatu – Dmitriy Yakovlev (KAZ)	4	2	2
9	Alexey Kuleshov – Alexandr Babichev (KAZ)	4	2	2
9	Haitham Al-Shereiqi – Ahmed Al-Housni (OMA)	4	2	2
9	Mohammed Al-Qishawi – Khaled Al-Arqan (PLE)	4	2	2
9	Nuttanon Inkiew – Sedtawat Padsawud (THA)	4	2	2
9	Surin Jongklang – Adisorn Khaolumtarn (THA)	4	2	2
17	Md Monir Hossain – Md Shahjahan Ali (BAN)	3	1	2
17	Yeung Pok Man – Chui Kam Lung (HKG)	3	1	2
17	Rafi Asruki Nordin – Raja Nazmi Saifuddin (MAS)	3	1	2
17	Tamer Abdelrasoul – Mahdi Sammoud (QAT)	3	1	2
17	Asanka Pradeep Kumara – Malintha Yapa (SRI)	3	1	2
17	Wang Chin-ju – Hsieh Ya-jen (TPE)	3	1	2
17	Lý Văn Quốc – Nguyễn Ngọc Quý (VIE)	3	1	2
17	Nguyễn Bá Trường Đăng – Phạm Lê Đình Khôi (VIE)	3	1	2
25	Mohib Jan Ahmadi – Ozair Mohammad Asifi (AFG)	3	0	3
25	Obaidullah Alikhail – Najibullah Mayar (AFG)	3	0	3
25	Wong Pui Lam – Kelvin Lau (HKG)	3	0	3
25	Kim Jun-young – Kim Hong-chan (KOR)	3	0	3
25	Ashfag Adam – Ahmed Mohamed (MDV)	3	0	3
25	Ismail Sajid – Shiunaz Abdul Wahid (MDV)	3	0	3
25	Inocêncio Xavier – Robson Xavier (TLS)	3	0	3
25	Hsu Chen-wei – Wu Shin-shian (TPE)	3	0	3
