= Volleyball at the 2023 SEA Games =

2023 tournament in Phnom Penh, Cambodia

- Venue: Olympic Complex Indoor Main Hall (indoor); Chumteav Mao Beach (beach)
- Dates: 3–16 May
- Nations: 10

Volleyball at the 2023 SEA Games took place in Phnom Penh, Cambodia from 3 to 16 May 2023. The 2023 Games featured competitions in four events. The indoor volleyball competition took place at Olympic Complex Indoor Main Hall, and the beach volleyball competitions were held at Chumteav Mao Beach in Sihanoukville.

== Medal table ==
* Host nation (Cambodia)

Rank	Nation	Gold	Silver	Bronze	Total
1	Indonesia	2	1	1	4
2	Thailand	2	1	0	3
3	Vietnam	0	1	2	3
4	Cambodia*	0	1	1	2
5	Philippines	0	0	1	1
Totals (5 entries)		4	4	5	13

== Participating nations ==
Nation	Indoor		Beach	
Nation	Men	Women	Men	Women
Cambodia	Yes	Yes	Yes	Yes
Laos	No	No	Yes	No
Indonesia	Yes	Yes	Yes	Yes
Malaysia	Yes	Yes	Yes	Yes
Myanmar	Yes	Yes	No	No
Philippines	Yes	Yes	Yes	Yes
Singapore	Yes	Yes	Yes	Yes
Thailand	Yes	Yes	Yes	Yes
Timor-Leste	No	No	Yes	No
Vietnam	Yes	Yes	Yes	Yes
Total: 10 NOCs	8	8	9	7

== Competition schedule ==
Indoor volleyball events were held from 3 to 14 May 2023, while beach volleyball events were held from 11 to 16 May 2023.

== Indoor volleyball ==
=== Men's tournament ===
The tournament featured 8 countries. There were two groups of four teams with round-robin format each. The top two of each group played in the semifinal round. The winners of the semifinal round played for the gold medal and the losers played for the bronze medal.

Rank	Team	Pld	W	L
1st place, gold medalist(s)	Indonesia	5	5	0
2nd place, silver medalist(s)	Cambodia	5	3	2
3rd place, bronze medalist(s)	Vietnam	5	3	2
4	Thailand	5	3	2
5	Philippines	5	2	3
6	Singapore	5	2	3
7	Myanmar	5	1	4
8	Malaysia	5	1	4

=== Women's tournament ===
The tournament featured 8 countries. There were two groups of four teams with round-robin format each. The top two of each group played in the semifinal round. The winners of the semifinal round played for the gold medal and the losers played for the bronze medal.

Rank	Team	Pld	W	L
1st place, gold medalist(s)	Thailand	5	5	0
2nd place, silver medalist(s)	Vietnam	5	4	1
3rd place, bronze medalist(s)	Indonesia	5	3	2
4	Philippines	5	2	3
5	Singapore	5	3	2
6	Malaysia	5	2	3
7	Myanmar	5	1	4
8	Cambodia	5	0	5

== Beach volleyball ==
=== Men's tournament ===
The tournament featured 9 countries separated into 2 pools with round robin format. Each country had 2 pairs of players playing in a best of 3 set match. The top two of group played in the semifinal round. The winners of the semifinal round played for the gold medal and the losers played for the bronze.

=== Women's tournament ===
The tournament featured 7 countries separated into 2 pools with round robin format. Each country had 2 pairs of players playing in a best of 3 set match. The top two of group played in the semifinal round. The winners of the semifinal round played for the gold medal and the losers played for the bronze.

== Medalists ==
Event	Gold	Silver	Bronze
Men's indoor volleyball	Indonesia; Henry Ade Novian; Boy Arnez Arabi; Hendra Kurniawan; Muhammad Malizi; Yuda Mardiansyah Putra; Fahri Septian Putratama; Rivan Nurmulki; Hernanda Zulfi; Farhan Halim; Dio Zulfikri; Agil Angga Anggara; Fahreza Rakha Abhinaya; Doni Haryono; Nizar Julfikar Munawar	Cambodia; Sovandara Khim; Phearoth Chheang; Narith Born; Sarun Pin; Siden Din; Veasna Voeurn; Heng Soeurn; Menglaiy Mouen; Mom Kuon; Ratanak Phol; Channaro Sound; Nimul Mourn; Phaniet Phol; Sokheang An	Vietnam; Huỳnh Trung Trực; Trịnh Duy Phúc; Giang Văn Đức; Quản Trọng Nghĩa; Nguyễn Văn Quốc Duy; Nguyễn Văn Nam; Trần Duy Tuyến; Từ Thanh Thuận; Nguyễn Thanh Hải; Vũ Ngọc Hoàng; Đinh Văn Duy; Nguyễn Ngọc Thuân; Dương Văn Tiên; Cù Văn Hoàn
Women's indoor volleyball	Thailand; Piyanut Pannoy; Thatdao Nuekjang; Warisara Seetaloed; Watchareeya Nuanjam; Khatthalee Pinsuwan; Hattaya Bamrungsuk; Soraya Phomla; Pimpichaya Kokram; Ajcharaporn Kongyot; Chatchu-on Moksri; Supattra Pairoj; Thanacha Sooksod; Sirima Manakij; Wimonrat Thanapan	Vietnam; Lê Thị Thanh Liên; Trần Thị Thanh Thúy; Phạm Thị Nguyệt Anh; Trần Thị Bích Thủy; Hoàng Thị Kiều Trinh; Nguyễn Khánh Đang; Võ Thị Kim Thoa; Nguyễn Thị Trinh; Vi Thị Như Quỳnh; Đoàn Thị Xuân; Đoàn Thị Lâm Oanh; Trần Tú Linh; Lý Thị Luyến; Đinh Thị Trà Giang	Indonesia; Yulis Indahyani; Ratri Wulandari; Megawati Hangestri Pertiwi; Arneta Putri Amelian; Nandita Ayu Salsabila; Hany Budiarti; Agustin Wulandhari; Wilda Nurfadhilah; Tisya Amallya Putri; Shintia Alliva Mauludina; Aulia Suci Nurfadilla; Mediol Stiovany Yoku
Men's beach volleyball	Indonesia; Gilang Ramadhan; Danangsyah Pribadi; Mohammad Ashfiya; Bintang Akbar	Thailand; Surin Jongklang; Dunwinit Kaewsai; Pithak Tipjan; Poravid Taovato	Philippines; Jude Garcia; James Buytrago; Alnakran Abdilla; Jaron Requinton
Women's beach volleyball	Thailand; Taravadee Naraphornrapat; Worapeerachayakorn Kongphopsarutawadee; Varapatsorn Radarong; Tanarattha Udomchavee	Indonesia; Dhita Juliana; Desi Ratnasari; Nur Sari; Yokebed Purari	Vietnam; Đinh Thị Mỹ Ngà; Nguyễn Lê Thị Tường Vy; Nguyễn Thị Thanh Trâm; Châu Ngọc Lan
