= Oman at the 2018 Asian Games =

- IOC code: OMA
- NOC: Oman Olympic Committee
- Website: ooc.om/ar (in Arabic)

in Jakarta & Palembang, Indonesia 18 August – 2 September
- Competitors: 46 in 8 sports
- Flag bearer: Mahmood Al Hassani
- Medals: Gold 0 Silver 0 Bronze 0 Total 0

Asian Games appearances (overview)
- 1982; 1986; 1990; 1994; 1998; 2002; 2006; 2010; 2014; 2018; 2022; 2026

Oman competed in the 2018 Asian Games in Jakarta and Palembang, Indonesia from 18 August to 2 September 2018 This event marks the 10th Asian Games appearance for Oman since making their debut in 1982.

In May 2018, the Oman Olympic Committee (OOC) approved Omani delegation to take part in 9 sporting events including athletics, swimming, shooting, football, field hockey, beach volleyball, tennis, sailing and weightlifting during the multi-sporting competition. In August 2018, the OOC released that 46 athletes took part in eight sporting events such as hockey, beach volleyball, swimming, sailing, weightlifting, shooting, tennis and athletics.

== Athletics ==
Oman entered six men's athletes to participate in the athletics competition at the Games.

== Field hockey ==
The Oman national field hockey team qualified to compete at the 2018 Asian Games after progressing through the Asian Games qualification round defeating Bangladesh in the Qualifiers final which was held in Oman during March 2018.

Summary

Team	Event	Group stage						Semifinal	Final / BM / Pl.	
Team	Event	Opposition score	Opposition score	Opposition score	Opposition score	Opposition score	Rank	Opposition score	Opposition score	Rank
Oman men's	Men's tournament	Bangladesh; L 1–2	Pakistan; L 0–10	Thailand; W 2–0	Kazakhstan; W 4–0	Malaysia; L 0–7	4	Did not advance	Sri Lanka; W 5–2	7

=== Men's tournament ===
Roster

The following is the Oman roster in the men's field hockey tournament of the 2018 Asian Games.

Head coach: (Pakistan) Tahir Zaman

1. Muhanna Al-Hasani
3. Ammaar Al-Shaaibi
5. Younis Al-Nofli
7. Qosim Al-Shibli
8. Mahmood Al-Hasni (C)
9. Asaad Mubarak Al-Qasmi
10. Marwan Al-Raiisi
11. Basim Khatar Rajab
12. Khalid Al-Shaaibi
15. Faisal Ambork Alloun
16. Salah Al-Saadi
21. Imad Al-Hasani
22. Fahad Al-Noufali (GK)
23. Rashad Al-Fazari
25. Ali Salim Al-Zadjali
26. Ibrahim Al-Farsi (GK)
27. Sami Al-Laun
30. Mahmood Bait Shamaiaa

Pool B

Pos	Team	Pld	W	D	L	PF	PA	PD	Pts	Qualification
1	Pakistan	5	5	0	0	45	1	+44	15	Semi-finals
2	Malaysia	5	4	0	1	41	6	+35	12	Semi-finals
3	Bangladesh	5	3	0	2	11	15	−4	9	Fifth place game
4	Oman	5	2	0	3	7	19	−12	6	Seventh place game
5	Thailand	5	1	0	4	4	27	−23	3	Ninth place game
6	Kazakhstan	5	0	0	5	5	45	−40	0	Eleventh place game

Source: FIH
Rules for classification: 1) points; 2) goal difference; 3) goals scored; 4) head-to-head result.

20 August 2018
16:00

Bangladesh	2–1	Oman
Hossain 14'; Ashraful Islam 28'	Report	Al-Shaaibi 23'

Umpires:
Federico Garcia (URU)
Javed Shaikh (IND)

22 August 2018
20:00

Pakistan	10–0	Oman
Bhutta 2'; Ahmad 15'; Irfan 34', 59'; Shan 37', 44', 55'; Dilber 40', 49'; Atiq 41'	Report

Umpires:
Javed Shaikh (IND)
Gareth Greenfield (NZL)

24 August 2018
10:00

Oman	2–0	Thailand
Al-Shaaibi 6'; Al-Qasmi 55'	Report

Umpires:
Kim Hong-lae (KOR)
You Suolong (CHN)

26 August 2018
14:00

Oman	4–0	Kazakhstan
Al-Qasmi 14'; Al-Shibli 30'; Al-Shaaibi 49'; Al-Hasani 52'	Report

Umpires:
Raghu Prasad (IND)
Kim Hong-lae (KOR)

28 August 2018
14:00

Malaysia	7-0	Oman
Rahim 28'; Tajuddin 32', 45'; Fa. Saari 34', 48'; Ashari 37'; Rozemi 42'	Report

Umpires:
Raghu Prasad (IND)
Michihiko Watanabe (JPN)

Seventh place game

30 August 2018
15:00

Sri Lanka	2–5	Oman
Sudusinghe 14'; Rathnayake 55'	Report	M. Al-Hasani 5'; Al-Fazari 23', 40'; Al-Shibli 29'; Shamaiaa 44'

Umpires:
Gus Soteriades (USA)
Narongtuch Subboonsung (THA)

== Sailing ==
Oman took part in the sailing competition at the Games with three sailors.

Men

Athlete	Event	Race															Total	Rank
Athlete	Event	1	2	3	4	5	6	7	8	9	10	11	12	13	14	15	Total	Rank
Waleed Al-Kendi; Musab Al-Hadi	49er	5	2	4	3	5	2	8	2	1	3	~~(10)~~; DSQ	2	1	1	4	43	4

Mixed

Athlete	Event	Race												Total	Rank
Athlete	Event	1	2	3	4	5	6	7	8	9	10	11	12	Total	Rank
Abdulmalik Al-Hinai	Laser 4.7	7	17	8	3	3	2	7	~~(24)~~; UFD	12	12	9	9	89	9

== Shooting ==
Oman entered their athletes to compete in the shooting competition at the Games.

Men

Athlete	Event	Qualification		Final	
Athlete	Event	Points	Rank	Points	Rank
Ismail Al-Abri	10 m air pistol	566	27	Did not advance	
Said Al-Hashmi	25 m rapid fire pistol	561	16	Did not advance	
Issam Al-Balushi	10 m air rifle	611.1	32	Did not advance	
Issam Al-Balushi	50 m rifle three positions	1132	26	Did not advance	
Hamed Al-Khatri	50 m rifle three positions	1151	16	Did not advance	
Yousuf Al-Abri	300 m standard rifle	—N/a		526	12
Salyem Al-Malki	300 m standard rifle	—N/a		517	13
Hussein Al-Shuhoumi	Double trap	134	10	Did not advance	

Women

Athlete	Event	Qualification		Final	
Athlete	Event	Points	Rank	Points	Rank
Wadha Al-Balushi	10 m air pistol	546	34	Did not advance	
Wadha Al-Balushi	25 m pistol	506	32	Did not advance	
Siham Al-Hasani	10 m air rifle	610.0	33	Did not advance	
Amina Al-Tarshi	10 m air rifle	610.5	30	Did not advance	
Siham Al-Hasani	50 m rifle three positions	1128	27	Did not advance	
Amina Al-Tarshi	50 m rifle three positions	1113	30	Did not advance	

Mixed team

Athlete	Event	Qualification		Final	
Athlete	Event	Points	Rank	Points	Rank
Ismail Al-Abri; Wadha Al-Balushi	10 m air pistol	751	14	Did not advance	
Issam Al-Balushi; Amina Al-Tarshi	10 m air rifle	811.2	16	Did not advance	

== Swimming ==
Oman sent two men's swimmer to compete at the Games.

Men

Athlete	Event	Heats		Final	
Athlete	Event	Time	Rank	Time	Rank
Issa Samir Hamed Al-Adawi	50 m freestyle	24.68	38	Did not advance	
Issa Samir Hamed Al-Adawi	100 m freestyle	53.06	32	Did not advance	
Issa Samir Hamed Al-Adawi	200 m freestyle	1:58.19	27	Did not advance	
Abdul Rahman Al-Kulaibi	200 m butterfly	2:16.06	17	Did not advance	
Abdul Rahman Al-Kulaibi	200 m individual medley	2:13.95	16	Did not advance	
Abdul Rahman Al-Kulaibi	400 m individual medley	4:54.22	16	Did not advance	

== Tennis ==
Oman participated in the tennis competition at the Games with two athletes.

Women

Athlete	Event	Round of 64	Round of 32	Round of 16	Quarterfinals	Semifinals	Final	
Athlete	Event	Opposition Score	Opposition Score	Opposition Score	Opposition Score	Opposition Score	Opposition Score	Rank
Fatma Al-Nabhani	Singles	Bye	G Pakbaten (IRI); W 6–0, 6–4	Zhang SA (CHN); L 6–7^{(5–7)}, 1–6	Did not advance			

Mixed

Athlete	Event	Round of 64	Round of 32	Round of 16	Quarterfinals	Semifinals	Final	
Athlete	Event	Opposition Score	Opposition Score	Opposition Score	Opposition Score	Opposition Score	Opposition Score	Rank
Fatma Al-Nabhani; Mohammed Al-Nabhani	Doubles	A Seneviratne / Y de Silva (SRI); W 6–4, 6–3	Xu YF / Zhang Z (CHN); L 2–6, 2–6	Did not advance				

== Volleyball ==
Oman participated at the beach volleyball competition with four men's athletes.

=== Beach volleyball ===
Athlete	Event	Preliminary		Round of 16	Quarterfinals	Semifinals	Final / BM	
Athlete	Event	Oppositions Scores	Rank	Opposition Score	Opposition Score	Opposition Score	Opposition Score	Rank
Ahmed Al-Housni; Haitham Al Shereiqi	Men's tournament	Hsieh – Wang (TPE): W 2–1; Rachmawan – Ashfiya (INA): L 0–2; Asifi – Ahmadi (AFG): W 2–0	2 Q	Gao – Li (CHN); L 1–2	Did not advance			
Nouh Al-Jalbubi; Mazin Al-Hashmi	Men's tournament	Chui – Yeung (HKG): W 2–0; Inkiew – Padsawud (THA): W 2–0; Ahmed – Adam (MDV): W 2–0	1 Q	Alarqan – Al-Qishawi (PLE); W 2–0	Ramadhan – Pribadi (INA); L 0–2	Did not advance		

== Weightlifting ==
Oman prepared one athlete to compete at the Games. Asad Sultan Obaid Al Battashi eliminated from the competition because he did not show himself up at the weigh-in.

== See also ==
- Oman at the 2017 Asian Indoor and Martial Arts Games
- Oman at the 2018 Asian Para Games
