= Ibrahim Qusaya =

Palestinian volleyball player (1991–2023)

Personal information
- Born: 7 November 1991 Palestine
- Died: 14 November 2023 (aged 32) Jabalia refugee camp, Gaza, Palestine
Medal record
Men's volleyball
Representing Palestine
West Asian Beach Soccer Championship
Bronze medal – third place	2021

Ibrahim Qusaya (Arabic: إبراهيم قصيعة; 7 December 1991 – 14 November 2023), also spelled as Ibrahim Qassiya or Ibrahim Qasia, was a Palestinian volleyball player. He attended Ahmad al-Shaqiri School and received a bachelor's degree in physical education from Al-Aqsa University.

== Sports career ==
Qusaya was a member of the Palestinian national volleyball team. He won a bronze medal in the 2021 West Asian Beach Soccer Championship. Together with Abdallah Al-Arqan he represented Palestine in the men’s beach volleyball event at the 2023 Asian Games in Ningbo, China.

== Death ==
On 14 November 2023, he was killed in an Israeli airstrike on Jabalia refugee camp alongside teammate Hassan Zuaiter during the Gaza war.

== See also ==
- Casualties of the Gaza war
- Palestinian sports during the Israeli invasion of the Gaza Strip
