= Danangsyah Pribadi =

Indonesian beach volleyball player (born 1995)

Personal information
- Full name: Danangsyah Yudistira Pribadi
- Nationality: Indonesian
- Born: 12 May 1995 (age 31); Dompu, West Nusa Tenggara, Indonesia
- Height: 1.87 m (6 ft 2 in)
- Weight: 78 kg (172 lb)

Beach volleyball information
Teammate
Gilang Ramadhan
Honours
Men's beach volleyball
Representing Indonesia
Asian Games
Bronze medal – third place	2018 Jakarta-Palembang	Men
AVC Continental Cup
Silver medal – second place	2020 Nakhon Pathom	Men
Southeast Asian Games
Gold medal – first place	2019 Philippines	Men
Gold medal – first place	2023 Cambodia	Men
Gold medal – first place	2025 Thailand	Men

Danangsyah Yudistira Pribadi (born 12 May 1995) is an Indonesian beach volleyball player from Dompu Regency, West Nusa Tenggara. In 2018, Pribadi alongside Gilang Ramadhan won a bronze medal at the 2018 Asian Games in Palembang, Indonesia.
