= Ahmed Tijan =

Qatari beach volleyball player (born 1995)

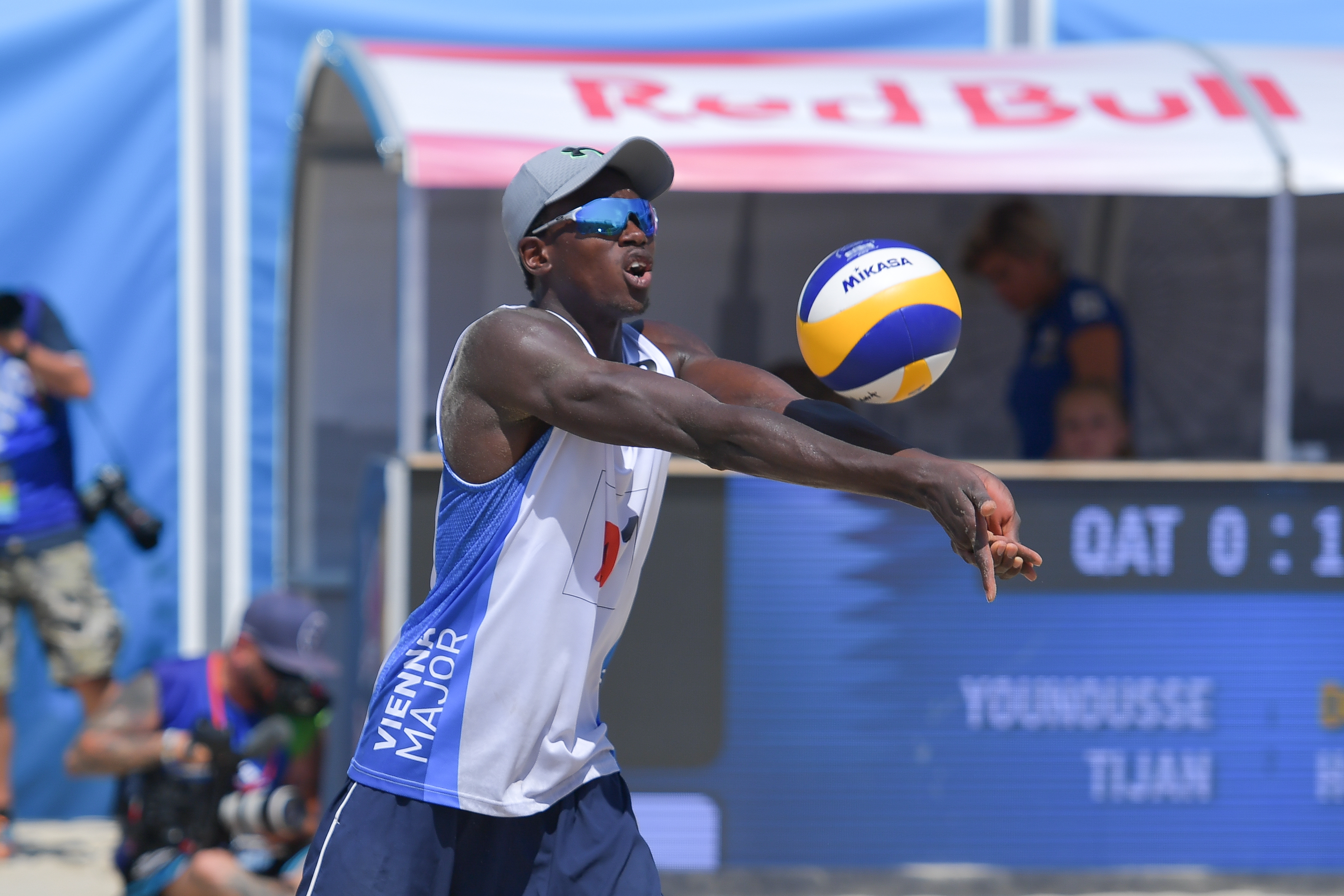
- Tijan in 2018

Personal information
- Full name: Ahmed Tijan Janko
- Nationality: Qatari
- Born: 28 April 1995 (age 31) Banjul, The Gambia
- Height: 185 cm (6 ft 1 in)
- Weight: 75 kg (165 lb)
Beach volleyball information
- Years: Teammate
- –: Cherif Younousse
Honours
Men's beach volleyball
Representing Qatar
Summer Olympics
Bronze medal – third place	2020 Tokyo	Team
Volleyball World Beach Pro Tour
Silver medal – second place	2024	João Pessoa Elite 16
Bronze medal – third place	2024	Doha The Finals
Asian Games
Gold medal – first place	2018 Jakarta–Palembang	Men
Gold medal – first place	2022 Hangzhou	Men
Gold medal – first place	2026 Aichi–Nagoya	Men
Asian Beach Games
Gold medal – first place	2026 Sanya	Men
Asian Championship
Bronze medal – third place	2021 Phuket	Men

Ahmed Tijan Janko (born on April 28, 1995) is a Qatari beach volleyball player originally from The Gambia. He alongside Cherif Younousse won three consecutive Asian Games gold medals in 2018, 2023, and 2026.

In 2018, he alongside Cherif Younousse clinched the gold medal at the 2018 Asian Games in Palembang, Indonesia. The pair qualified for the 2020 Summer Olympics, where they won the bronze medal, the first ever medal for Qatar in beach volleyball.
