= Cherif Younousse =

Qatari beach volleyball player (born 1995)

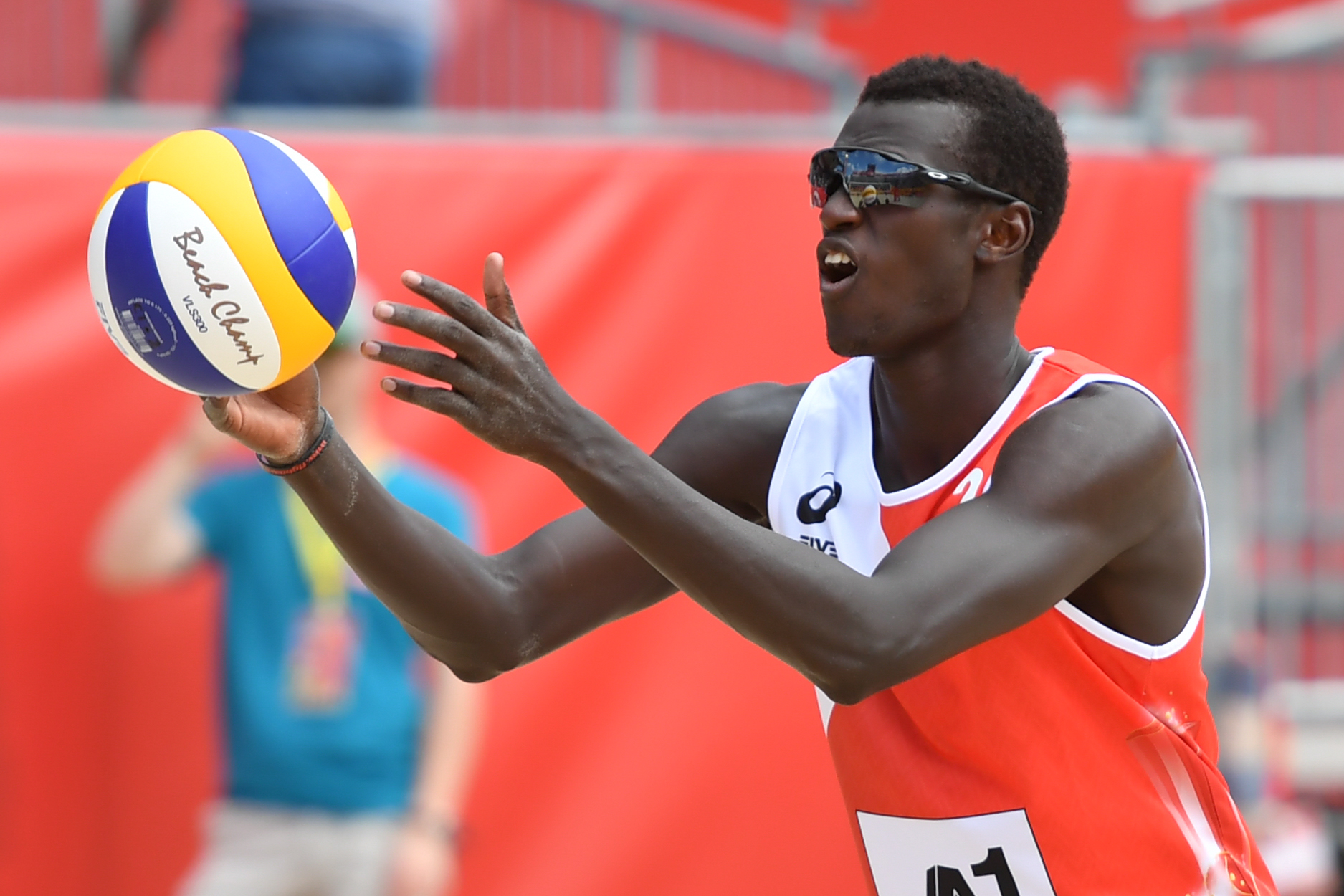
- Younousse in 2017

Personal information
- Full name: Cherif Younousse Samba
- Nationality: Qatari
- Born: 22 May 1995 (age 31); Senegal
- Height: 1.94 m (6 ft 4 in)
- Weight: 77 kg (170 lb)

Beach volleyball information
Teammate
Ahmed Tijan
Honours
Men's beach volleyball
Representing Qatar
Summer Olympics
Bronze medal – third place	2020 Tokyo	Team
Volleyball World Beach Pro Tour
Silver medal – second place	2024	João Pessoa Elite 16
Bronze medal – third place	2024	Doha The Finals
Asian Games
Gold medal – first place	2018 Jakarta–Palembang	Men
Gold medal – first place	2022 Hangzhou	Men
Gold medal – first place	2026 Aichi–Nagoya	Men
Asian Beach Games
Gold medal – first place	2026 Sanya	Men
Silver medal – second place	2016 Da Nang	Men
Asian Championship
Bronze medal – third place	2021 Phuket	Men

Cherif Younousse Samba (Arabic: شريف يونس سامبا, born 22 May 1995) is a Senegalese-born Olympic beach volleyball player competing for Qatar. He and his partner Ahmed Tijan were three time Asian Games champions, winning the gold medal in 2018, 2023, and 2026.

He competed in the 2016 Summer Olympics with teammate Jefferson Pereira. They were eliminated in the round of 16 of the men's tournament.

After ending the partnership with Ahmed Tijan in 2014, they were reunited in 2017. The pair qualified for the 2020 Summer Olympics, where they won the bronze medal, the first ever medal for Qatar in beach volleyball.
