= 2018–2020 AVC Beach Volleyball Continental Cup =

The 2018–2020 AVC Beach Volleyball Continental Cup was a beach volleyball double-gender event for teams representing Asian countries. The winners of the event qualified for the 2020 Summer Olympics.

== Men ==
=== Preliminary round ===
==== Central Asia ====
- Host: Visakhapatnam, India

Semifinals
16 December 2019
Iran	2
Sri Lanka	0
16 December 2019
Kazakhstan	2
India	0

Final
18 December 2019
Iran	2
Kazakhstan	0
3rd place
17 December 2019
Sri Lanka	2
India	0

- Iran advanced to the final round.
- Kazakhstan advanced to the semifinal round.

==== Eastern Asia ====
- Host: Zhongwei, China

Quarterfinals
26 August 2019
Hong Kong	2
South Korea	0

Semifinals
27 August 2019
China	2
Hong Kong	0
27 August 2019
Chinese Taipei	0
Japan	2

Final
28 August 2019
China	2
Japan	0

- China advanced to the final round.
- Japan advanced to the semifinal round.

==== Oceania ====
- Host: Tauranga, New Zealand

Quarterfinals
10 March 2020
Fiji	2
Samoa	0

Semifinals
11 March 2020
Australia	2
Tuvalu	0
11 March 2020
New Zealand	2
Fiji	0

Final
12 March 2020
Australia	0
New Zealand	2
3rd place
12 March 2020
Tuvalu	2
Fiji	0

- New Zealand advanced to the final round.
- Australia advanced to the semifinal round.

==== Southeastern Asia ====
Rank	Team
1	Indonesia
2	Thailand
3	Philippines
4	Singapore
5	Malaysia
5	Vietnam
7	Cambodia
7	Timor-Leste

- Thailand (as the hosts) and Indonesia advanced to the final round.
- Philippines advanced to the semifinal round.

==== Western Asia ====
- Host: Tripoli, Lebanon

Semifinals
1 August 2019
Lebanon	2
Kuwait	0
1 August 2019
Oman	2
Saudi Arabia	0

Final
2 August 2019
Lebanon	0
Oman	2
3rd place
2 August 2019
Kuwait	0
Saudi Arabia	2

- Qatar (as the defending champions) and Oman advanced to the final round.
- Lebanon advanced to the semifinal round.

=== Semifinal round ===
- Host: Nakhon Pathom, Thailand

Quarterfinals
18 June 2021
Philippines	2
Lebanon	1

Semifinals
18 June 2021
Japan	2
Kazakhstan	0
18 June 2021
Australia	2
Philippines	0

Final
19 June 2021
Japan	0
Australia	2

- Australia advanced to the final round.

=== Final round ===
- Host: Nakhon Pathom, Thailand

Quarterfinals
25 June 2021
China	1
Indonesia	2
25 June 2021
New Zealand	2
Thailand	0
25 June 2021
Iran	2
Qatar	1
25 June 2021
Oman	0
Australia	2

Semifinals
26 June 2021
Indonesia	2
New Zealand	1
26 June 2021
Iran	0
Australia	2

Final
27 June 2021
Indonesia	0
Australia	2

== Women ==
=== Preliminary round ===
==== Central Asia ====
- Host: Visakhapatnam, India

Semifinals
17 December 2019
India	0
Sri Lanka	2

Final
18 December 2019
Kazakhstan	2
Sri Lanka	0

- Kazakhstan advanced to the final round.
- Sri Lanka advanced to the semifinal round.

==== Eastern Asia ====
- Host: Zhongwei, China

Quarterfinals
26 August 2019
Hong Kong	2
South Korea	0

Semifinals
27 August 2019
China	2
Hong Kong	0
27 August 2019
Chinese Taipei	0
Japan	2

Final
28 August 2019
China	2
Japan	0

- China advanced to the final round.
- Japan advanced to the semifinal round.

==== Oceania ====
- Host: Tauranga, New Zealand

Semifinals
11 March 2020
New Zealand	2
Fiji	0
11 March 2020
Vanuatu	2
Solomon Islands	0

Final
12 March 2020
New Zealand	1
Vanuatu	2
3rd place
12 March 2020
Fiji	1
Solomon Islands	2

- Australia (as the defending champions) and Vanuatu advanced to the final round.
- New Zealand advanced to the semifinal round.

==== Southeastern Asia ====
Rank	Team
1	Thailand
2	Indonesia
3	Philippines
4	Vietnam
5	Malaysia
6	Singapore

- Thailand (as the hosts) and Indonesia advanced to the final round.
- Philippines advanced to the semifinal round.

=== Semifinal round ===
- Host: Nakhon Pathom, Thailand

Semifinals
18 June 2021
New Zealand	2
Philippines	1

Final
19 June 2021
Japan	2
New Zealand	1

- Japan and New Zealand advanced to the final round.

=== Final round ===
- Host: Nakhon Pathom, Thailand

Quarterfinals
25 June 2021
Thailand	2
Indonesia	0
25 June 2021
Vanuatu	0
Japan	2
25 June 2021
Australia	2
New Zealand	1
25 June 2021
Kazakhstan	1
China	2

Semifinals
26 June 2021
Thailand	0
Japan	2
26 June 2021
Australia	1
China	2

Final
27 June 2021
Japan	1
China	2
