= Mohammad Ashfiya =

Indonesian beach volleyball player (born 1995)

Personal information
- Nickname: Yaya
- Nationality: Indonesian
- Born: 19 May 1995 (age 31); Sidoarjo, East Java, Indonesia
- Height: 1.90 m (6 ft 3 in)
- Weight: 78 kg (172 lb)

Beach volleyball information
Teammate
Ade Candra Rachmawan
Honours
Men's beach volleyball
Representing Indonesia
Asian Games
Silver medal – second place	2018 Jakarta-Palembang	Men
AVC Continental Cup
Silver medal – second place	2020 Nakhon Pathom	Men
Southeast Asian Games
Gold medal – first place	2019 Philippines	Men
Gold medal – first place	2021 Vietnam	Men

Mohammad Ashfiya (born 19 May 1995) is an Indonesian beach volleyball player. He competed at the 2014 Summer Youth Olympics in Nanjing, China. In 2017, Ashfiya alongside Ade Candra Rachmawan competed at the 2017 World Championships but did not advance to the knockout stage after lost three matches in the group stage. He and Rachmawan then won a silver medal at the 2018 Asian Games in Palembang, Indonesia.

== Achievements ==
=== FIVB Beach Volleyball World Tour ===
Key

World Tour Finals
5-star tournament/Major Series
4-star tournament
3-star tournament
2-star tournament
1-star tournament

Year	Tournament	Partner	Opponent	Score	Result
2018	SMM Pak Bara Beach Satun	(Indonesia) Ade Candra Rachmawan	(Thailand) Nuttanon Inkiew (Thailand) Sedtawat Padsawud	19–21, 16–21	(silver) Runner-up
2018	Singapore Open presented by Neo Group	(Indonesia) Ade Candra Rachmawan	(Slovenia) Neck Zemljak (Slovenia) Jan Pokeršnik	28–26, 22–20	(bronze) Third place
