= Dmitriy Yakovlev =

Kazakhstani beach volleyball player (born 1988)

Personal information
- Nationality: Kazakhstani
- Born: 18 August 1988 (age 38)
Honours
Men's beach volleyball
Representing Kazakhstan
Asian Games
Bronze medal – third place	2022 Hangzhou	Men

Dmitriy Yakovlev (born 18 January 1988, Дмитрий Александрович Яковлев) is a Kazakhstani beach volleyball player. He competed at the 2012 Asian Beach Games in Haiyang, China.
