= Beach volleyball at the 2014 Asian Games =

- Venue: Songdo Beach Volleyball Venue
- Dates: 20–29 September 2014
- Competitors: 84 from 18 nations

Beach volleyball at the 2014 Asian Games was held in Incheon, South Korea from September 20 to 29, 2014. In this tournament, 18 nations played in the men's competition, and 7 nations participated in women's competition.

== Schedule ==
| P | Preliminary round | R | Round of 16 | ¼ | Quarterfinals | ½ | Semifinals | F | Finals |

| Event↓/Date → | 20th Sat | 21st Sun | 22nd Mon | 23rd Tue | 24th Wed | 25th Thu | 26th Fri | 27th Sat | 28th Sun | 29th Mon |
|---|---|---|---|---|---|---|---|---|---|---|
| Men | P | P | P | P | P | R | ¼ | ½ | | F |
| Women | P | P | P | P | P | R | ¼ | ½ | F | |

== Medalists ==
| Event | Gold | Silver | Bronze |
|---|---|---|---|
| Men | Kazakhstan; Alexey Sidorenko; Alexandr Dyachenko | China; Chen Cheng; Li Jian | China; Bao Jian; Abuduhalikejiang Mutailipu |
| Women | China; Ma Yuanyuan; Xia Xinyi | Thailand; Tanarattha Udomchavee; Varapatsorn Radarong | China; Wang Fan; Yue Yuan |

== Medal table ==
| Rank | Nation | Gold | Silver | Bronze | Total |
|---|---|---|---|---|---|
| 1 | China (CHN) | 1 | 1 | 2 | 4 |
| 2 | Kazakhstan (KAZ) | 1 | 0 | 0 | 1 |
| 3 | Thailand (THA) | 0 | 1 | 0 | 1 |
| Totals (3 entries) | | 2 | 2 | 2 | 6 |

== Participating nations ==
A total of 84 athletes from 18 nations competed in beach volleyball at the 2014 Asian Games:

- Afghanistan (4)
- Bangladesh (2)
- Cambodia (2)
- China (8)
- Hong Kong (4)
- Indonesia (4)
- Japan (8)
- Kazakhstan (6)
- Kuwait (4)
- Malaysia (4)
- Maldives (4)
- Oman (4)
- Qatar (4)
- South Korea (8)
- Sri Lanka (4)
- Tajikistan (4)
- Thailand (8)
- Timor-Leste (2)

== Final standing ==
=== Men ===
| Rank | Team | Pld | W | L |
|---|---|---|---|---|
| 1st place, gold medalist(s) | Alexey Sidorenko – Alexandr Dyachenko (KAZ) | 6 | 6 | 0 |
| 2nd place, silver medalist(s) | Chen Cheng – Li Jian (CHN) | 7 | 6 | 1 |
| 3rd place, bronze medalist(s) | Bao Jian – Abuduhalikejiang Mutailipu (CHN) | 7 | 6 | 1 |
| 4 | Koko Prasetyo Darkuncoro – Ade Candra Rachmawan (INA) | 7 | 5 | 2 |
| 5 | Dian Putra Santosa – Fahriansyah (INA) | 5 | 3 | 2 |
| 5 | Yoshiumi Hasegawa – Yuya Ageba (JPN) | 5 | 4 | 1 |
| 5 | Hitoshi Murakami – Takumi Takahashi (JPN) | 5 | 3 | 2 |
| 5 | Tamer Abdelrasoul – Abdelaziz Khallouf (QAT) | 5 | 4 | 1 |
| 9 | Chui Kam Lung – Wong Chun Wai (HKG) | 4 | 2 | 2 |
| 9 | Kuleshov Kuleshov – Dmitriy Yakovlev (KAZ) | 4 | 3 | 1 |
| 9 | Rafi Asruki Nordin – Razif Mahadi (MAS) | 3 | 1 | 2 |
| 9 | Haitham Al-Shereiqi – Ahmed Al-Housni (OMA) | 4 | 2 | 2 |
| 9 | Tiago Santos – Jefferson Pereira (QAT) | 4 | 3 | 1 |
| 9 | Mahesh Perera – Wasantha Rathnapala (SRI) | 4 | 2 | 2 |
| 9 | Chutipong Sukarayotin – Kittipat Yungtin (THA) | 4 | 2 | 2 |
| 9 | Prathip Sukto – Sittichai Sangkhachot (THA) | 4 | 2 | 2 |
| 17 | Habibullah Sadat – Edris Meyagul (AFG) | 3 | 1 | 2 |
| 17 | Sim Khlork – Lim Samat (CAM) | 3 | 1 | 2 |
| 17 | Kim Dae-kyoung – Cha Young-min (KOR) | 3 | 1 | 2 |
| 17 | Moon Jung-hyun – Lee Hee-yoon (KOR) | 3 | 1 | 2 |
| 17 | Raja Nazmi Saifuddin – Mohd Aizzat Zokri (MAS) | 3 | 1 | 2 |
| 17 | Adnan Abdul Hameed – Ibrahim Adil (MDV) | 3 | 1 | 2 |
| 17 | Faisal Al-Subhi – Mazin Al-Hashmi (OMA) | 2 | 0 | 2 |
| 17 | Asanka Pradeep Kumara – Pubudu Ekanayaka (SRI) | 3 | 1 | 2 |
| 25 | Zaker Ali Mohammad – Pardes Safi (AFG) | 3 | 0 | 3 |
| 25 | Horosit Biswas – Md Monir Hossain (BAN) | 3 | 0 | 3 |
| 25 | Jasem Al-Sabaghah – Faisal Al-Ajmi (KUW) | 3 | 0 | 3 |
| 25 | Abdulaziz Dashti – Yaqoub Bin Eid (KUW) | 3 | 0 | 3 |
| 25 | Shiunaz Abdul Wahid – Ahmed Anil Naseer (MDV) | 3 | 0 | 3 |
| 25 | Mukhsini Rustamzoda – Sharif Yorzoda (TJK) | 3 | 0 | 3 |
| 25 | Gaudêncio Xavier – Adriano Correia (TLS) | 3 | 0 | 3 |

=== Women ===
| Rank | Team | Pld | W | L |
|---|---|---|---|---|
| 1st place, gold medalist(s) | Ma Yuanyuan – Xia Xinyi (CHN) | 5 | 5 | 0 |
| 2nd place, silver medalist(s) | Tanarattha Udomchavee – Varapatsorn Radarong (THA) | 5 | 4 | 1 |
| 3rd place, bronze medalist(s) | Wang Fan – Yue Yuan (CHN) | 4 | 3 | 1 |
| 4 | Yupa Phokongploy – Usa Tenpaksee (THA) | 5 | 3 | 2 |
| 5 | Ayumi Kusano – Sakurako Fujii (JPN) | 4 | 2 | 2 |
| 5 | Megumi Murakami – Erika Habaguchi (JPN) | 4 | 2 | 2 |
| 5 | Tatyana Mashkova – Irina Tsimbalova (KAZ) | 3 | 1 | 2 |
| 5 | Lee Eun-a – Yoon Hye-suk (KOR) | 4 | 1 | 3 |
| 9 | Ng Tin Lai – Wong Yuen Mei (HKG) | 3 | 0 | 3 |
| 9 | Kim Ka-yeon – Jeon Ha-nel (KOR) | 3 | 0 | 3 |
| 9 | Shahnoza Nazirova – Malika Dilovarshoeva (TJK) | 2 | 0 | 2 |
