= 2014 Asian Beach Volleyball Championships =

International beach volleyball competition

- Location: Jinjiang, China
- Dates: 5–8 June 2014

The 2014 Asian Beach Volleyball Championship was a beach volleyball event, that was held from June 5 to 8, 2014 in Jinjiang, China.

== Medal summary ==
Event	Gold	Silver	Bronze
Men	Australia; Isaac Kapa; Chris McHugh	Kazakhstan; Dmitriy Yakovlev; Alexey Kuleshov	Qatar; Tiago Santos; Jefferson Pereira
Women	Australia; Louise Bawden; Taliqua Clancy	Thailand; Varapatsorn Radarong; Tanarattha Udomchavee	China; Xue Chen; Xia Xinyi

== Participating nations ==
=== Men ===
- Australia (2)
- China (3)
- Chinese Taipei (2)
- Hong Kong (2)
- Indonesia (2)
- Iran (2)
- Japan (2)
- Kazakhstan (2)
- Nepal (1)
- New Zealand (1)
- Qatar (2)
- Singapore (1)
- Thailand (2)

=== Women ===
- Australia (2)
- China (3)
- Chinese Taipei (1)
- Hong Kong (2)
- Japan (2)
- Kazakhstan (2)
- Nepal (1)
- Thailand (2)
- Vanuatu (2)

== Men's tournament ==
=== Preliminary round ===
==== Pool E ====
Pos	Team	Pld	W	L	Pts	SW	SL	SR	SPW	SPL	SPR
1	(Kazakhstan) Sidorenko–Dyachenko	2	2	0	4	4	0	MAX	86	70	1.229
2	(Qatar) Abdelaziz–Abdelrasoul	2	1	1	3	2	2	1.000	75	70	1.071
3	(Thailand) Sukarayotin–Kittipat	2	0	2	2	0	4	0.000	65	86	0.756

Source: AVC

Date		Score		Set 1	Set 2	Set 3
05 Jun	Abdelaziz–Abdelrasoul (Qatar)	2–0	(Thailand) Sukarayotin–Kittipat	21–9	21–19	
06 Jun	Sidorenko–Dyachenko (Kazakhstan)	2–0	(Thailand) Sukarayotin–Kittipat	23–21	21–16	
06 Jun	Sidorenko–Dyachenko (Kazakhstan)	2–0	(Qatar) Abdelaziz–Abdelrasoul	21–17	21–16	

==== Pool F ====
Pos	Team	Pld	W	L	Pts	SW	SL	SR	SPW	SPL	SPR
1	(Australia) Kapa–McHugh	2	2	0	4	4	0	MAX	84	42	2.000
2	(China) Li Zhuoxin–Zhang Lizeng	2	1	1	3	2	2	1.000	64	69	0.928
3	(Hong Kong) Chui–Wong	2	0	2	2	0	4	0.000	47	84	0.560

Source: AVC

Date		Score		Set 1	Set 2	Set 3
05 Jun	Li Zhuoxin–Zhang Lizeng (China)	2–0	(Hong Kong) Chui–Wong	21–10	21–17	
06 Jun	Kapa–McHugh (Australia)	2–0	(Hong Kong) Chui–Wong	21–12	21–8	
06 Jun	Kapa–McHugh (Australia)	2–0	(China) Li Zhuoxin–Zhang Lizeng	21–10	21–12	

==== Pool G ====
Pos	Team	Pld	W	L	Pts	SW	SL	SR	SPW	SPL	SPR
1	(China) Ch. Chen–Li	2	2	0	4	4	0	MAX	84	54	1.556
2	(Iran) P. Farrokhi–A. Salagh	2	1	1	3	2	2	1.000	70	60	1.167
3	(Singapore) H.C. Zhuo–J.P. Tan	2	0	2	2	0	4	0.000	44	84	0.524

Source: AVC

Date		Score		Set 1	Set 2	Set 3
05 Jun	P. Farrokhi–A. Salagh (Iran)	2–0	(Singapore) H.C. Zhuo–J.P. Tan	21–9	21–9	
06 Jun	Ch. Chen–Li (China)	2–0	(Singapore) H.C. Zhuo–J.P. Tan	21–17	21–9	
06 Jun	Ch. Chen–Li (China)	2–0	(Iran) P. Farrokhi–A. Salagh	21–16	21–12	

==== Pool H ====
Pos	Team	Pld	W	L	Pts	SW	SL	SR	SPW	SPL	SPR
1	(Kazakhstan) Yakovlev–Kuleshov	2	2	0	4	4	0	MAX	84	57	1.474
2	(Japan) Hata–Nakaya	2	1	1	3	2	2	1.000	75	76	0.987
3	(Hong Kong) Kelvin–Lam	2	0	2	2	0	4	0.000	59	85	0.694

Source: AVC

Date		Score		Set 1	Set 2	Set 3
05 Jun	Hata–Nakaya (Japan)	2–0	(Hong Kong) Kelvin–Lam	22–20	21–14	
06 Jun	Yakovlev–Kuleshov (Kazakhstan)	2–0	(Hong Kong) Kelvin–Lam	21–11	21–14	
06 Jun	Yakovlev–Kuleshov (Kazakhstan)	2–0	(Japan) Hata–Nakaya	21–13	21–19	

==== Pool I ====
Pos	Team	Pld	W	L	Pts	SW	SL	SR	SPW	SPL	SPR
1	(Iran) R. Raoufi–B. Salemi	2	2	0	4	4	2	2.000	115	103	1.117
2	(Qatar) De J Santos–Santos Pereira	2	1	1	3	3	2	1.500	101	83	1.217
3	(Indonesia) Dian–Fahri	2	0	2	2	1	4	0.250	68	98	0.694

Source: AVC

Date		Score		Set 1	Set 2	Set 3
05 Jun	R. Raoufi–B. Salemi (Iran)	2–1	(Indonesia) Dian–Fahri	20–22	21–14	15–8
06 Jun	De J Santos–Santos Pereira (Qatar)	2–0	(Indonesia) Dian–Fahri	21–13	21–11	
06 Jun	De J Santos–Santos Pereira (Qatar)	1–2	(Iran) R. Raoufi–B. Salemi	27–29	21–15	11–15

==== Pool J ====
Pos	Team	Pld	W	L	Pts	SW	SL	SR	SPW	SPL	SPR
1	(New Zealand) Watson–Sam O'Dea	2	2	0	4	4	0	MAX	84	57	1.474
2	(China) Ha Likejiang–Bao J.	2	1	1	3	2	2	1.000	70	69	1.014
3	(Chinese Taipei) Lee Y.T.–Juan S.H.	2	0	2	2	0	4	0.000	56	84	0.667

Source: AVC

Date		Score		Set 1	Set 2	Set 3
05 Jun	Watson–Sam O'Dea (New Zealand)	2–0	(Chinese Taipei) Lee Y.T.–Juan S.H.	21–12	21–17	
06 Jun	Ha Likejiang–Bao J. (China)	2–0	(Chinese Taipei) Lee Y.T.–Juan S.H.	21–14	21–13	
06 Jun	Ha Likejiang–Bao J. (China)	0–2	(New Zealand) Watson–Sam O'Dea	11–21	17–21	

==== Pool K ====
Pos	Team	Pld	W	L	Pts	SW	SL	SR	SPW	SPL	SPR
1	(Indonesia) Koko–Candra	2	2	0	4	4	1	4.000	97	79	1.228
2	(Japan) Hasegawa–Ageba	2	1	1	3	3	2	1.500	91	82	1.110
3	(Chinese Taipei) Jao T.W.–Huang W.C.	2	0	2	2	0	4	0.000	57	84	0.679

Source: AVC

Date		Score		Set 1	Set 2	Set 3
05 Jun	Koko–Candra (Indonesia)	2–0	(Chinese Taipei) Jao T.W.–Huang W.C.	21–15	21–15	
06 Jun	Hasegawa–Ageba (Japan)	2–0	(Chinese Taipei) Jao T.W.–Huang W.C.	21–14	21–13	
06 Jun	Hasegawa–Ageba (Japan)	1–2	(Indonesia) Koko–Candra	17–21	21–19	11–15

==== Pool L ====
Pos	Team	Pld	W	L	Pts	SW	SL	SR	SPW	SPL	SPR
1	(Thailand) Sukto–Sangkhachot	2	2	0	4	4	1	4.000	97	79	1.228
2	(Australia) Court–Schumann	2	1	1	3	3	2	1.500	93	55	1.691
3	(Nepal) Sanjay–Im	2	0	2	2	0	4	0.000	28	84	0.333

Source: AVC

Date		Score		Set 1	Set 2	Set 3
05 Jun	Court–Schumann (Australia)	2–0	(Nepal) Sanjay–Im	Walkover		
06 Jun	Sukto–Sangkhachot (Thailand)	2–0	(Nepal) Sanjay–Im	21–12	21–16	
06 Jun	Sukto–Sangkhachot (Thailand)	2–1	(Australia) Court–Schumann	21–18	19–21	15–12

=== Knockout round ===
Round of 16; 7 June
(Kazakhstan) Sidorenko–Dyachenko	19	21	13
(Qatar) De J Santos–Santos Pereira	21	18	15
(Thailand) Sukto–Sangkhachot	23	21	13
(Qatar) Abdelaziz–Abdelrasoul	21	23	15
(Iran) R. Raoufi–B. Salemi	17	19
(Australia) Court–Schumann	21	21
(Kazakhstan) Yakovlev–Kuleshov	21	19	17
(China) Li Zhuoxin–Zhang Lizeng	16	21	15
(China) Ch. Chen–Li	21	21
(Japan) Hasegawa–Ageba	8	15
(New Zealand) Watson–Sam O'Dea	21	18	15
(Iran) P. Farrokhi–A. Salagh	19	21	7
(Indonesia) Koko–Candra	21	21
(Japan) Hata–Nakaya	17	11
(Australia) Kapa–McHugh	21	21
(China) Ha Likejiang–Bao J.	14	17

Quarterfinals; 7 June
(Qatar) De J Santos–Santos Pereira	21	21
(Qatar) Abdelaziz–Abdelrasoul	15	11
(Australia) Court–Schumann	14	18
(Kazakhstan) Yakovlev–Kuleshov	21	21
(China) Ch. Chen–Li	21	11	9
(New Zealand) Watson–Sam O'Dea	19	21	15
(Indonesia) Koko–Candra	17	19
(Australia) Kapa–McHugh	21	21

Semifinals; 8 June
(Qatar) De J Santos–Santos Pereira	21	18	13
(Kazakhstan) Yakovlev–Kuleshov	12	21	15
(New Zealand) Watson–Sam O'Dea	21	21	12
(Australia) Kapa–McHugh	23	12	15

Final; 8 June
(Kazakhstan) Yakovlev–Kuleshov	17	17
(Australia) Kapa–McHugh	21	21
3rd place
(Qatar) De J Santos–Santos Pereira	21	27
(New Zealand) Watson–Sam O'Dea	14	25

== Women's tournament ==
=== Preliminary round ===
==== Pool A ====
Pos	Team	Pld	W	L	Pts	SW	SL	SR	SPW	SPL	SPR
1	(China) Xue–X.Y. Xia	3	3	0	6	6	1	6.000	140	107	1.308
2	(Australia) Artacho–Laird	3	2	1	5	5	2	2.500	138	97	1.423
3	(Thailand) Tenpaksee–Phokongploy	3	1	2	4	2	4	0.500	103	109	0.945
4	(Chinese Taipei) Song Y.R.–Pan T.Y.	3	0	3	3	0	6	0.000	58	126	0.460

Source: AVC

Date		Score		Set 1	Set 2	Set 3
05 Jun	Xue–X.Y. Xia (China)	2–0	(Chinese Taipei) Song Y.R.–Pan T.Y.	21–5	21–14	
05 Jun	Artacho–Laird (Australia)	2–0	(Thailand) Tenpaksee–Phokongploy	21–14	21–13	
05 Jun	Xue–X.Y. Xia (China)	2–0	(Thailand) Tenpaksee–Phokongploy	21–19	21–15	
05 Jun	Artacho–Laird (Australia)	2–0	(Chinese Taipei) Song Y.R.–Pan T.Y.	21–7	21–7	
06 Jun	Xue–X.Y. Xia (China)	2–1	(Australia) Artacho–Laird	21–19	20–22	15–13
06 Jun	Tenpaksee–Phokongploy (Thailand)	2–0	(Chinese Taipei) Song Y.R.–Pan T.Y.	21–11	21–14	

==== Pool B ====
Pos	Team	Pld	W	L	Pts	SW	SL	SR	SPW	SPL	SPR
1	(Japan) Take–Mizoe	3	3	0	6	6	1	6.000	136	112	1.214
2	(Kazakhstan) Mashkova–Tsimbalova	3	2	1	5	5	2	2.500	138	103	1.340
3	(Vanuatu) Matauatu–Joe	3	1	2	4	2	5	0.400	104	135	0.770
4	(China) Y.Y. Wang–Tang N.Y.	3	0	3	3	1	6	0.167	111	139	0.799

Source: AVC

Date		Score		Set 1	Set 2	Set 3
05 Jun	Mashkova–Tsimbalova (Kazakhstan)	2–0	(Vanuatu) Matauatu–Joe	21–7	21–16	
05 Jun	Take–Mizoe (Japan)	2–0	(China) Y.Y. Wang–Tang N.Y.	21–17	21–15	
05 Jun	Mashkova–Tsimbalova (Kazakhstan)	2–0	(China) Y.Y. Wang–Tang N.Y.	21–12	21–16	
05 Jun	Take–Mizoe (Japan)	2–0	(Vanuatu) Matauatu–Joe	21–13	21–13	
06 Jun	Mashkova–Tsimbalova (Kazakhstan)	1–2	(Japan) Take–Mizoe	21–15	20–22	13–15
06 Jun	Y.Y. Wang–Tang N.Y. (China)	1–2	(Vanuatu) Matauatu–Joe	21–19	17–21	13–15

==== Pool C ====
Pos	Team	Pld	W	L	Pts	SW	SL	SR	SPW	SPL	SPR
1	(China) Wang Fan–Yue Y.	3	3	0	6	6	0	MAX	126	72	1.750
2	(Vanuatu) Elwin–Iatika	3	2	1	5	4	2	2.000	118	83	1.422
3	(Kazakhstan) Samalikova–Varassova	3	1	2	4	2	4	0.500	79	115	0.687
4	(Hong Kong) Lo–Yeung	3	0	3	3	0	6	0.000	73	126	0.579

Source: AVC

Date		Score		Set 1	Set 2	Set 3
05 Jun	Wang Fan–Yue Y. (China)	2–0	(Hong Kong) Lo–Yeung	21–9	21–12	
05 Jun	Elwin–Iatika (Vanuatu)	2–0	(Kazakhstan) Samalikova–Varassova	21–12	21–8	
05 Jun	Wang Fan–Yue Y. (China)	2–0	(Kazakhstan) Samalikova–Varassova	21–8	21–9	
05 Jun	Elwin–Iatika (Vanuatu)	2–0	(Hong Kong) Lo–Yeung	21–9	21–12	
06 Jun	Wang Fan–Yue Y. (China)	2–0	(Vanuatu) Elwin–Iatika	21–19	21–15	
06 Jun	Samalikova–Varassova (Kazakhstan)	2–0	(Hong Kong) Lo–Yeung	21–15	21–16	

==== Pool D ====
Pos	Team	Pld	W	L	Pts	SW	SL	SR	SPW	SPL	SPR
1	(Australia) Bawden–Clancy	4	4	0	8	8	0	MAX	168	69	2.435
2	(Thailand) Radarong–Udomchavee	4	3	1	7	6	2	3.000	155	108	1.435
3	(Japan) Kusano–Sakurako	4	2	2	6	4	4	1.000	112	120	0.933
4	(Hong Kong) Yuen Mei–Cat	4	1	3	5	2	6	0.333	109	146	0.747
5	(Nepal) Kopila–Kamala	4	0	4	4	0	8	0.000	67	168	0.399

Source: AVC

Date		Score		Set 1	Set 2	Set 3
05 Jun	Bawden–Clancy (Australia)	2–0	(Nepal) Kopila–Kamala	21–6	21–10	
05 Jun	Kusano–Sakurako (Japan)	2–0	(Hong Kong) Yuen Mei–Cat	21–19	21–7	
05 Jun	Radarong–Udomchavee (Thailand)	2–0	(Hong Kong) Yuen Mei–Cat	21–11	21–6	
05 Jun	Radarong–Udomchavee (Thailand)	0–2	(Australia) Bawden–Clancy	15–21	14–21	
05 Jun	Kusano–Sakurako (Japan)	2–0	(Nepal) Kopila–Kamala	21–5	21–5	
06 Jun	Radarong–Udomchavee (Thailand)	2–0	(Japan) Kusano–Sakurako	21–14	21–14	
06 Jun	Yuen Mei–Cat (Hong Kong)	2–0	(Nepal) Kopila–Kamala	21–10	21–10	
06 Jun	Bawden–Clancy (Australia)	2–0	(Japan) Kusano–Sakurako	Walkover		
06 Jun	Bawden–Clancy (Australia)	2–0	(Hong Kong) Yuen Mei–Cat	21–12	21–12	
06 Jun	Radarong–Udomchavee (Thailand)	2–0	(Nepal) Kopila–Kamala	21–6	21–15	

=== Knockout round ===
Round of 16; 7 June
(China) Xue–X.Y. Xia	W	O
(China) Y.Y. Wang–Tang N.Y.
(Vanuatu) Elwin–Iatika	21	21
(Vanuatu) Matauatu–Joe	16	18
(Kazakhstan) Mashkova–Tsimbalova	21	21
(Thailand) Tenpaksee–Phokongploy	19	17
(Australia) Bawden–Clancy	21	21
(Chinese Taipei) Song Y.R.–Pan T.Y.	11	4
(China) Wang Fan–Yue Y.	21	21
(Hong Kong) Yuen Mei–Cat	10	8
(Thailand) Radarong–Udomchavee	21	21
(Kazakhstan) Samalikova–Varassova	13	13
(Australia) Artacho–Laird	21	22
(Japan) Kusano–Sakurako	19	20
(Japan) Take–Mizoe	21	21
(Hong Kong) Lo–Yeung	7	9

Quarterfinals; 7 June
(China) Xue–X.Y. Xia	21	21
(Vanuatu) Elwin–Iatika	16	16
(Kazakhstan) Mashkova–Tsimbalova	16	21	10
(Australia) Bawden–Clancy	21	18	15
(China) Wang Fan–Yue Y.	19	21
(Thailand) Radarong–Udomchavee	21	23
(Australia) Artacho–Laird	29	21	11
(Japan) Take–Mizoe	31	17	15

Semifinals; 8 June
(China) Xue–X.Y. Xia	21	19	10
(Australia) Bawden–Clancy	17	21	15
(Thailand) Radarong–Udomchavee	21	21
(Japan) Take–Mizoe	18	18

Final; 8 June
(Australia) Bawden–Clancy	23	21
(Thailand) Radarong–Udomchavee	21	13
3rd place
(China) Xue–X.Y. Xia	21	21
(Japan) Take–Mizoe	16	8
