= 2012 Asian Beach Volleyball Championships =

International beach volleyball competition

- Location: Haikou, China
- Dates: 1–4 November 2012

The 2012 Asian Beach Volleyball Championship was a beach volleyball event, that was held from November 1 to 4, 2012 in Haikou, China.

== Medal summary ==
Event	Gold	Silver	Bronze
Men	Australia; Isaac Kapa; Chris McHugh	China; Chen Cheng; Li Jian	Indonesia; Koko Prasetyo Darkuncoro; Ade Candra Rachmawan
Women	China; Zhang Xi; Xue Chen	Vanuatu; Henriette Iatika; Miller Elwin	China; Yue Yuan; Ma Yuanyuan

== Participating nations ==
=== Men ===
- Australia (2)
- China (3)
- Hong Kong (2)
- Indonesia (1)
- Iran (1)
- Japan (1)
- Kazakhstan (2)
- Malaysia (1)
- New Zealand (2)
- Oman (2)
- Singapore (1)
- Thailand (2)

=== Women ===
- Australia (1)
- China (3)
- Hong Kong (2)
- Japan (1)
- Kazakhstan (1)
- Singapore (2)
- Thailand (2)
- Vanuatu (1)

== Men's tournament ==
=== Preliminary round ===
==== Pool A ====
Pos	Team	Pld	W	L	Pts	SW	SL	SR	SPW	SPL	SPR
1	(China) Ch. Chen–Li	4	4	0	8	8	1	8.000	175	127	1.378
2	(Indonesia) Koko–Ade	4	3	1	7	6	4	1.500	183	172	1.064
3	(Kazakhstan) Dyachenko–Sidorenko	4	2	2	6	6	4	1.500	184	162	1.136
4	(New Zealand) Morunga–Muller	4	1	3	5	3	6	0.500	153	173	0.884
5	(Hong Kong) Kwok Wing Ho–Chui Kam Lung	4	0	4	4	0	8	0.000	107	168	0.637

Source: AVC

Date		Score		Set 1	Set 2	Set 3
01 Nov	Ch. Chen–Li (China)	2–0	(Hong Kong) Kwok Wing Ho–Chui Kam Lung	21–10	21–7	
01 Nov	Koko–Ade (Indonesia)	2–1	(New Zealand) Morunga–Muller	20–22	21–16	15–13
01 Nov	Dyachenko–Sidorenko (Kazakhstan)	2–0	(New Zealand) Morunga–Muller	21–14	21–17	
01 Nov	Ch. Chen–Li (China)	2–0	(Indonesia) Koko–Ade	21–14	21–16	
01 Nov	Dyachenko–Sidorenko (Kazakhstan)	2–0	(Hong Kong) Kwok Wing Ho–Chui Kam Lung	21–11	21–16	
02 Nov	Koko–Ade (Indonesia)	2–0	(Hong Kong) Kwok Wing Ho–Chui Kam Lung	21–13	21–17	
02 Nov	Dyachenko–Sidorenko (Kazakhstan)	1–2	(China) Ch. Chen–Li	17–21	21–13	13–15
02 Nov	Dyachenko–Sidorenko (Kazakhstan)	1–2	(Indonesia) Koko–Ade	21–17	13–21	15–17
02 Nov	Morunga–Muller (New Zealand)	2–0	(Hong Kong) Kwok Wing Ho–Chui Kam Lung	21–17	21–16	
02 Nov	Ch. Chen–Li (China)	2–0	(New Zealand) Morunga–Muller	21–14	21–15	

==== Pool B ====
Pos	Team	Pld	W	L	Pts	SW	SL	SR	SPW	SPL	SPR
1	(China) Wu Penggen–Wu Jiaxin	4	4	0	8	8	1	8.000	178	129	1.380
2	(Thailand) Sittichai–Prathip	4	3	1	7	6	4	1.500	173	164	1.055
3	(Oman) Ahmed–Haitham	4	2	2	6	6	4	1.500	184	150	1.227
4	(Japan) Hasegawa–Ageba	4	1	3	5	3	6	0.500	145	150	0.967
5	(Hong Kong) Wong Chun–Wong Kwun	4	0	4	4	0	8	0.000	81	168	0.482

Source: AVC

Date		Score		Set 1	Set 2	Set 3
01 Nov	Sittichai–Prathip (Thailand)	2–1	(Japan) Hasegawa–Ageba	13–21	21–18	15–13
01 Nov	Ahmed–Haitham (Oman)	2–0	(Hong Kong) Wong Chun–Wong Kwun	21–10	21–13	
01 Nov	Wu Penggen–Wu Jiaxin (China)	2–0	(Hong Kong) Wong Chun–Wong Kwun	21–15	21–9	
01 Nov	Sittichai–Prathip (Thailand)	2–1	(Oman) Ahmed–Haitham	24–22	13–21	15–10
01 Nov	Wu Penggen–Wu Jiaxin (China)	2–0	(Japan) Hasegawa–Ageba	21–12	21–16	
02 Nov	Ahmed–Haitham (Oman)	2–0	(Japan) Hasegawa–Ageba	21–15	21–8	
02 Nov	Wu Penggen–Wu Jiaxin (China)	2–0	(Thailand) Sittichai–Prathip	21–19	21–11	
02 Nov	Wu Penggen–Wu Jiaxin (China)	2–1	(Oman) Ahmed–Haitham	16–21	21–19	15–7
02 Nov	Wong Chun–Wong Kwun (Hong Kong)	0–2	(Japan) Hasegawa–Ageba	7–21	10–21	
02 Nov	Sittichai–Prathip (Thailand)	2–0	(Hong Kong) Wong Chun–Wong Kwun	21–8	21–9	

==== Pool C ====
Pos	Team	Pld	W	L	Pts	SW	SL	SR	SPW	SPL	SPR
1	(Australia) Kapa–McHugh	4	4	0	8	8	0	MAX	168	100	1.680
2	(Kazakhstan) Yakovlev–Kuleshov	4	3	1	7	6	4	1.500	187	176	1.063
3	(Malaysia) Chiong Ung–Rafi	4	2	2	6	5	4	1.250	167	160	1.044
4	(New Zealand) Kapa–Seymour	4	1	3	5	3	6	0.500	148	165	0.897
5	(Singapore) Soh–Zhuo	4	0	4	4	0	8	0.000	101	170	0.594

Source: AVC

Date		Score		Set 1	Set 2	Set 3
01 Nov	Chiong Ung–Rafi (Malaysia)	0–2	(New Zealand) Kapa–Seymour	16–21	16–21	
01 Nov	Kapa–McHugh (Australia)	2–0	(Singapore) Soh–Zhuo	21–7	21–11	
01 Nov	Yakovlev–Kuleshov (Kazakhstan)	2–0	(Singapore) Soh–Zhuo	21–13	21–16	
01 Nov	Chiong Ung–Rafi (Malaysia)	0–2	(Australia) Kapa–McHugh	9–21	15–21	
01 Nov	Yakovlev–Kuleshov (Kazakhstan)	2–1	(New Zealand) Kapa–Seymour	21–17	19–21	21–19
02 Nov	Kapa–McHugh (Australia)	2–0	(New Zealand) Kapa–Seymour	21–9	21–17	
02 Nov	Yakovlev–Kuleshov (Kazakhstan)	2–1	(Malaysia) Chiong Ung–Rafi	16–21	21–15	15–12
02 Nov	Yakovlev–Kuleshov (Kazakhstan)	0–2	(Australia) Kapa–McHugh	16–21	16–21	
02 Nov	Soh–Zhuo (Singapore)	0–2	(New Zealand) Kapa–Seymour	13–21	12–21	
02 Nov	Chiong Ung–Rafi (Malaysia)	2–0	(Singapore) Soh–Zhuo	21–8	23–21	

==== Pool D ====
Pos	Team	Pld	W	L	Pts	SW	SL	SR	SPW	SPL	SPR
1	(Iran) Farrokhi–Salagh	4	4	0	8	8	3	2.667	203	161	1.261
2	(China) Hong Jiajun–Xu	4	3	1	7	7	3	2.333	180	156	1.154
3	(Australia) Boland–Schumann	4	2	2	6	5	5	1.000	165	168	0.982
4	(Oman) Al-Balushi–Badar	4	1	3	5	5	6	0.833	184	196	0.939
5	(Thailand) Toyam–Sukarayotin	4	0	4	4	0	8	0.000	117	168	0.696

Source: AVC

Date		Score		Set 1	Set 2	Set 3
01 Nov	Farrokhi–Salagh (Iran)	2–1	(Australia) Boland–Schumann	21–15	15–21	15–10
01 Nov	Al-Balushi–Badar (Oman)	2–0	(Thailand) Toyam–Sukarayotin	21–19	21–18	
01 Nov	Hong Jiajun–Xu (China)	2–0	(Thailand) Toyam–Sukarayotin	21–16	21–13	
01 Nov	Farrokhi–Salagh (Iran)	2–1	(Oman) Al-Balushi–Badar	21–13	20–22	15–8
01 Nov	Hong Jiajun–Xu (China)	2–0	(Australia) Boland–Schumann	21–12	21–15	
02 Nov	Al-Balushi–Badar (Oman)	1–2	(Australia) Boland–Schumann	14–21	21–9	18–20
02 Nov	Hong Jiajun–Xu (China)	1–2	(Iran) Farrokhi–Salagh	17–21	21–18	5–15
02 Nov	Hong Jiajun–Xu (China)	2–1	(Oman) Al-Balushi–Badar	21–19	17–21	15–6
02 Nov	Toyam–Sukarayotin (Thailand)	0–2	(Australia) Boland–Schumann	13–21	9–21	
02 Nov	Farrokhi–Salagh (Iran)	2–0	(Thailand) Toyam–Sukarayotin	21–11	21–18	

=== Knockout round ===
Round of 16; 3 November
(China) Ch. Chen–Li	21	21
(Japan) Hasegawa–Ageba	15	16
(Oman) Ahmed–Haitham	17	17
(China) Hong Jiajun–Xu	21	21
(Kazakhstan) Yakovlev–Kuleshov	15	14
(Kazakhstan) Dyachenko–Sidorenko	21	21
(Malaysia) Chiong Ung–Rafi	16	12
(Iran) Farrokhi–Salagh	21	21
(Australia) Kapa–McHugh	21	24
(Oman) Al-Balushi–Badar	16	22
(New Zealand) Kapa–Seymour	19	17
(Thailand) Sittichai–Prathip	21	21
(Indonesia) Koko–Ade	21	21
(Australia) Boland–Schumann	18	16
(New Zealand) Morunga–Muller	20	17
(China) Wu Penggen–Wu Jiaxin	22	21

Quarterfinals; 3 November
(China) Ch. Chen–Li	21	19	15
(China) Hong Jiajun–Xu	16	21	12
(Kazakhstan) Dyachenko–Sidorenko	15	20
(Iran) Farrokhi–Salagh	21	22
(Australia) Kapa–McHugh	21	21
(Thailand) Sittichai–Prathip	12	14
(Indonesia) Koko–Ade	18	21	17
(China) Wu Penggen–Wu Jiaxin	21	13	15

Semifinals; 4 November
(China) Ch. Chen–Li	22	21
(Iran) Farrokhi–Salagh	20	19
(Australia) Kapa–McHugh	21	21
(Indonesia) Koko–Ade	14	17

Final; 4 November
(China) Ch. Chen–Li	18	17
(Australia) Kapa–McHugh	21	21
3rd place
(Iran) Farrokhi–Salagh	18	21	10
(Indonesia) Koko–Ade	21	16	15

== Women's tournament ==
=== Preliminary round ===
==== Pool A ====
Pos	Team	Pld	W	L	Pts	SW	SL	SR	SPW	SPL	SPR
1	(China) Zhang Xi–Xue	2	2	0	4	4	0	MAX	87	49	1.776
2	(Japan) Kusano–Mizoe	2	1	1	3	2	2	1.000	76	66	1.152
3	(Singapore) Sai–Huang	2	0	2	2	0	4	0.000	36	84	0.429

Source: AVC

Date		Score		Set 1	Set 2	Set 3
01 Nov	Kusano–Mizoe (Japan)	2–0	(Singapore) Sai–Huang	21–14	21–7	
01 Nov	Zhang Xi–Xue (China)	2–0	(Singapore) Sai–Huang	21–7	21–8	
02 Nov	Zhang Xi–Xue (China)	2–0	(Japan) Kusano–Mizoe	21–12	24–22	

==== Pool B ====
Pos	Team	Pld	W	L	Pts	SW	SL	SR	SPW	SPL	SPR
1	(Australia) Artacho–Clancy	2	2	0	4	4	0	MAX	84	43	1.953
2	(Thailand) Sannok–Tenpaksee	2	1	1	3	2	2	1.000	60	61	0.984
3	(Hong Kong) Yuen Mei–Tin Lai	2	0	2	2	0	4	0.000	44	84	0.524

Source: AVC

Date		Score		Set 1	Set 2	Set 3
01 Nov	Yuen Mei–Tin Lai (Hong Kong)	0–2	(Australia) Artacho–Clancy	10–21	15–21	
01 Nov	Sannok–Tenpaksee (Thailand)	0–2	(Australia) Artacho–Clancy	10–21	8–21	
02 Nov	Sannok–Tenpaksee (Thailand)	2–0	(Hong Kong) Yuen Mei–Tin Lai	21–11	21–8	

==== Pool C ====
Pos	Team	Pld	W	L	Pts	SW	SL	SR	SPW	SPL	SPR
1	(Vanuatu) Iatika–Elwin	2	2	0	4	4	0	MAX	88	57	1.544
2	(Thailand) Udomchavee–Radarong	2	1	1	3	2	2	1.000	82	83	0.988
3	(China) Ch.M. Huang–Li Ying	2	0	2	2	0	4	0.000	58	88	0.659

Source: AVC

Date		Score		Set 1	Set 2	Set 3
01 Nov	Iatika–Elwin (Vanuatu)	2–0	(China) Ch.M. Huang–Li Ying	21–5	21–16	
01 Nov	Udomchavee–Radarong (Thailand)	2–0	(China) Ch.M. Huang–Li Ying	25–23	21–14	
02 Nov	Udomchavee–Radarong (Thailand)	0–2	(Vanuatu) Iatika–Elwin	23–25	13–21	

==== Pool D ====
Pos	Team	Pld	W	L	Pts	SW	SL	SR	SPW	SPL	SPR
1	(China) Yue Y.–Y.Y. Ma	3	3	0	6	6	0	MAX	126	53	2.377
2	(Kazakhstan) Mashkova–Tsimbalova	3	2	1	5	4	2	2.000	116	61	1.902
3	(Hong Kong) C.Y. Lo–Ming	3	1	2	4	2	4	0.500	69	115	0.600
4	(Singapore) Tan–Gabrielle Gomes	3	0	3	3	0	6	0.000	44	126	0.349

Source: AVC

Date		Score		Set 1	Set 2	Set 3
01 Nov	Mashkova–Tsimbalova (Kazakhstan)	2–0	(Singapore) Tan–Gabrielle Gomes	21–4	21–2	
01 Nov	Yue Y.–Y.Y. Ma (China)	2–0	(Hong Kong) C.Y. Lo–Ming	21–8	21–6	
01 Nov	Mashkova–Tsimbalova (Kazakhstan)	2–0	(Hong Kong) C.Y. Lo–Ming	21–7	21–6	
01 Nov	Yue Y.–Y.Y. Ma (China)	2–0	(Singapore) Tan–Gabrielle Gomes	21–4	21–3	
02 Nov	Mashkova–Tsimbalova (Kazakhstan)	0–2	(China) Yue Y.–Y.Y. Ma	17–21	15–21	
02 Nov	C.Y. Lo–Ming (Hong Kong)	2–0	(Singapore) Tan–Gabrielle Gomes	21–13	21–18	

=== Knockout round ===
Round of 16; 3 November
(Singapore) Sai–Huang	8	12
(Thailand) Udomchavee–Radarong	21	21
(Kazakhstan) Mashkova–Tsimbalova	21	14	15
(Hong Kong) Yuen Mei–Tin Lai	18	21	11
(China) Ch.M. Huang–Li Ying	20	15
(China) Yue Y.–Y.Y. Ma	22	21
(Hong Kong) C.Y. Lo–Ming	8	7
(Thailand) Sannok–Tenpaksee	21	21
(Japan) Kusano–Mizoe	21	21
(Singapore) Tan–Gabrielle Gomes	10	6

Quarterfinals; 3 November
(China) Zhang Xi–Xue	21	21
(Thailand) Udomchavee–Radarong	12	16
(Kazakhstan) Mashkova–Tsimbalova	12	14
(China) Yue Y.–Y.Y. Ma	21	21
(Vanuatu) Iatika–Elwin	21	19	15
(Thailand) Sannok–Tenpaksee	16	21	9
(Japan) Kusano–Mizoe	17	17
(Australia) Artacho–Clancy	21	21

Semifinals; 4 November
(China) Zhang Xi–Xue	12	21	15
(China) Yue Y.–Y.Y. Ma	21	16	13
(Vanuatu) Iatika–Elwin	21	12	15
(Australia) Artacho–Clancy	15	21	12

Final; 4 November
(China) Zhang Xi–Xue	21	21
(Vanuatu) Iatika–Elwin	14	15
3rd place
(China) Yue Y.–Y.Y. Ma	21	12	15
(Australia) Artacho–Clancy	14	21	9
