= 2009 Asian Beach Volleyball Championships =

International beach volleyball competition

- Location: Haikou, China
- Dates: 23–26 December 2009

The 2009 Asian Beach Volleyball Championship was a beach volleyball event, that was held from December 23 to 26, 2009 in Haikou, China.

== Medal summary ==
Event	Gold	Silver	Bronze
Men	China; Wu Penggen; Xu Linyin	Kazakhstan; Dmitriy Yakovlev; Alexey Kulinich	Japan; Kentaro Asahi; Katsuhiro Shiratori
Women	China; Xue Chen; Zhang Xi	China; Jin Jieqiong; Yue Yuan	Japan; Mutsumi Ozaki; Ayumi Kusano

== Participating nations ==
=== Men ===
- China (3)
- Hong Kong (2)
- India (1)
- Indonesia (1)
- Iran (2)
- Japan (2)
- Kazakhstan (2)
- Malaysia (1)
- Oman (2)
- Philippines (1)
- South Korea (1)
- Sri Lanka (2)
- Thailand (2)

=== Women ===
- China (3)
- Chinese Taipei (1)
- Hong Kong (2)
- Indonesia (1)
- Japan (2)
- Kazakhstan (2)
- Malaysia (2)
- Philippines (1)
- South Korea (1)
- Sri Lanka (2)
- Thailand (2)
- Vietnam (2)

== Men's tournament ==
=== Preliminary round ===
==== Pool A ====
Pos	Team	Pld	W	L	Pts	SW	SL	SR	SPW	SPL	SPR
1	(China) Penggen–Linyin	2	2	0	4	4	0	MAX	84	44	1.909
2	(Sri Lanka) Dammika–Pubudu	2	1	1	3	2	2	1.000	68	74	0.919
3	(Hong Kong) Lam–Ho	2	0	2	2	0	4	0.000	50	84	0.595

Source: Results

Date		Score		Set 1	Set 2	Set 3
23 Dec	Dammika–Pubudu (Sri Lanka)	2–0	(Hong Kong) Lam–Ho	21–14	21–18	
23 Dec	Penggen–Linyin (China)	2–0	(Hong Kong) Lam–Ho	21–10	21–8	
24 Dec	Penggen–Linyin (China)	2–0	(Sri Lanka) Dammika–Pubudu	21–14	21–12	

==== Pool B ====
Pos	Team	Pld	W	L	Pts	SW	SL	SR	SPW	SPL	SPR
1	(Japan) Asahi–Shiratori	1	1	0	2	2	0	MAX	43	30	1.433
2	(Thailand) Kittipat–Sataporn	1	0	1	1	0	2	0.000	30	43	0.698

Source: Results

Date		Score		Set 1	Set 2	Set 3
24 Dec	Asahi–Shiratori (Japan)	2–0	(Thailand) Kittipat–Sataporn	22–20	21–10	

==== Pool C ====
Pos	Team	Pld	W	L	Pts	SW	SL	SR	SPW	SPL	SPR
1	(China) Gao–Li	1	1	0	2	2	0	MAX	42	25	1.680
2	(India) Kasi–Kiran	1	0	1	1	0	2	0.000	25	42	0.595

Source: Results

Date		Score		Set 1	Set 2	Set 3
24 Dec	Gao–Li (China)	2–0	(India) Kasi–Kiran	21–16	21–9	

==== Pool D ====
Pos	Team	Pld	W	L	Pts	SW	SL	SR	SPW	SPL	SPR
1	(Kazakhstan) Alexandr–Alexey	2	2	0	4	4	0	MAX	84	41	2.049
2	(Sri Lanka) Sampath–Wasantha	2	1	1	3	2	2	1.000	69	60	1.150
3	(South Korea) Jang–Baek	2	0	2	2	0	4	0.000	32	84	0.381

Source: Results

Date		Score		Set 1	Set 2	Set 3
23 Dec	Sampath–Wasantha (Sri Lanka)	2–0	(South Korea) Jang–Baek	21–8	21–10	
23 Dec	Alexandr–Alexey (Kazakhstan)	2–0	(South Korea) Jang–Baek	21–5	21–9	
24 Dec	Alexandr–Alexey (Kazakhstan)	2–0	(Sri Lanka) Sampath–Wasantha	21–15	21–12	

==== Pool E ====
Pos	Team	Pld	W	L	Pts	SW	SL	SR	SPW	SPL	SPR
1	(China) Yong–Chen	2	2	0	4	4	1	4.000	95	78	1.218
2	(Oman) Haitham–Ahmed	2	1	1	3	3	2	1.500	93	83	1.120
3	(Philippines) Usman–Espiritu	2	0	2	2	0	4	0.000	57	84	0.679

Source: Results

Date		Score		Set 1	Set 2	Set 3
23 Dec	Usman–Espiritu (Philippines)	0–2	(Oman) Haitham–Ahmed	11–21	19–21	
23 Dec	Yong–Chen (China)	2–1	(Oman) Haitham–Ahmed	17–21	21–17	15–13
24 Dec	Yong–Chen (China)	2–0	(Philippines) Usman–Espiritu	21–13	21–14	

==== Pool F ====
Pos	Team	Pld	W	L	Pts	SW	SL	SR	SPW	SPL	SPR
1	(Kazakhstan) Dmitriy–Alexey	2	2	0	4	4	0	MAX	84	57	1.474
2	(Hong Kong) Pong–Wai	2	1	1	3	2	2	1.000	72	85	0.847
3	(Malaysia) Faiz Putra–Fitri	2	0	2	2	0	4	0.000	75	89	0.843

Source: Results

Date		Score		Set 1	Set 2	Set 3
23 Dec	Pong–Wai (Hong Kong)	2–0	(Malaysia) Faiz Putra–Fitri	22–20	25–23	
23 Dec	Dmitriy–Alexey (Kazakhstan)	2–0	(Malaysia) Faiz Putra–Fitri	21–14	21–18	
24 Dec	Dmitriy–Alexey (Kazakhstan)	2–0	(Hong Kong) Pong–Wai	21–16	21–9	

==== Pool G ====
Pos	Team	Pld	W	L	Pts	SW	SL	SR	SPW	SPL	SPR
1	(Indonesia) Koko–Suratna	2	2	0	4	4	0	MAX	84	61	1.377
2	(Iran) Ebrahim–Azim	2	1	1	3	2	3	0.667	91	101	0.901
3	(Oman) Khalifa–Badar	2	0	2	2	1	4	0.250	90	103	0.874

Source: Results

Date		Score		Set 1	Set 2	Set 3
23 Dec	Ebrahim–Azim (Iran)	2–1	(Oman) Khalifa–Badar	21–23	25–23	15–13
24 Dec	Koko–Suratna (Indonesia)	2–0	(Oman) Khalifa–Badar	21–12	21–19	
24 Dec	Koko–Suratna (Indonesia)	2–0	(Iran) Ebrahim–Azim	21–16	21–14	

==== Pool H ====
Pos	Team	Pld	W	L	Pts	SW	SL	SR	SPW	SPL	SPR
1	(Thailand) Sittichai–Prathip	2	2	0	4	4	0	MAX	84	44	1.909
2	(Iran) Reza–Rahman	2	1	1	3	2	2	1.000	68	74	0.919
3	(Japan) Aoki–Hidaka	2	0	2	2	0	4	0.000	50	84	0.595

Source: Results

Date		Score		Set 1	Set 2	Set 3
23 Dec	Reza–Rahman (Iran)	2–0	(Japan) Aoki–Hidaka	21–13	21–18	
24 Dec	Sittichai–Prathip (Thailand)	2–0	(Japan) Aoki–Hidaka	21–16	21–18	
24 Dec	Sittichai–Prathip (Thailand)	2–0	(Iran) Reza–Rahman	21–18	21–18	

=== Knockout round ===
Round of 16; 25 December
(China) Penggen–Linyin	21	21
(Oman) Haitham–Ahmed	14	11
(Thailand) Sittichai–Prathip	16	21	13
(Iran) Ebrahim–Azim	21	18	15
(China) Yong–Chen	14	21	15
(Iran) Reza–Rahman	21	18	12
(Kazakhstan) Alexandr–Alexey	21	21
(India) Kasi–Kiran	12	14
(China) Gao–Li	21	21
(Sri Lanka) Dammika–Pubudu	16	16
(Kazakhstan) Dmitriy–Alexey	21	21
(Sri Lanka) Sampath–Wasantha	15	14
(Indonesia) Koko–Suratna	19	21	10
(Thailand) Kittipat–Sataporn	21	18	15
(Japan) Asahi–Shiratori	21	21
(Hong Kong) Pong–Wai	8	9

Quarterfinals; 25 December
(China) Penggen–Linyin	21	21
(Iran) Ebrahim–Azim	14	14
(China) Yong–Chen	16	19
(Kazakhstan) Alexandr–Alexey	21	21
(China) Gao–Li	17	14
(Kazakhstan) Dmitriy–Alexey	21	21
(Thailand) Kittipat–Sataporn	21	16	8
(Japan) Asahi–Shiratori	19	21	15

Semifinals; 26 December
(China) Penggen–Linyin	21	21
(Kazakhstan) Alexandr–Alexey	19	15
(Kazakhstan) Dmitriy–Alexey	11	21	15
(Japan) Asahi–Shiratori	21	18	10

Final; 26 December
(China) Penggen–Linyin	21	21
(Kazakhstan) Dmitriy–Alexey	11	13
3rd place
(Kazakhstan) Alexandr–Alexey	13	21	10
(Japan) Asahi–Shiratori	21	17	15

== Women's tournament ==
=== Preliminary round ===
==== Pool A ====
Pos	Team	Pld	W	L	Pts	SW	SL	SR	SPW	SPL	SPR
1	(China) Xue–Zhang	2	2	0	4	4	0	MAX	84	44	1.909
2	(Vietnam) Hậu–Loan	2	1	1	3	2	2	1.000	65	78	0.833
3	(Hong Kong) Clara–Sonia	2	0	2	2	0	4	0.000	58	85	0.682

Source: Results

Date		Score		Set 1	Set 2	Set 3
23 Dec	Hậu–Loan (Vietnam)	2–0	(Hong Kong) Clara–Sonia	21–16	22–20	
23 Dec	Xue–Zhang (China)	2–0	(Hong Kong) Clara–Sonia	21–11	21–11	
24 Dec	Xue–Zhang (China)	2–0	(Vietnam) Hậu–Loan	21–10	21–12	

==== Pool B ====
Pos	Team	Pld	W	L	Pts	SW	SL	SR	SPW	SPL	SPR
1	(Japan) Tanaka–Mizoe	1	1	0	2	2	0	MAX	42	18	2.333
2	(Sri Lanka) Sewwandi–Sujeewa	1	0	1	1	0	2	0.000	18	42	0.429

Source: Results

Date		Score		Set 1	Set 2	Set 3
24 Dec	Tanaka–Mizoe (Japan)	2–0	(Sri Lanka) Sewwandi–Sujeewa	21–10	21–8	

==== Pool C ====
Pos	Team	Pld	W	L	Pts	SW	SL	SR	SPW	SPL	SPR
1	(China) Jin–Yue	2	2	0	4	4	0	MAX	84	50	1.680
2	(Vietnam) Mãi–Yến	2	1	1	3	2	3	0.667	77	91	0.846
3	(Malaysia) Teck Eng–Kwan Kee	2	0	2	2	1	4	0.250	76	96	0.792

Source: Results

Date		Score		Set 1	Set 2	Set 3
23 Dec	Mãi–Yến (Vietnam)	2–1	(Malaysia) Teck Eng–Kwan Kee	17–21	21–14	16–14
23 Dec	Jin–Yue (China)	2–0	(Malaysia) Teck Eng–Kwan Kee	21–15	21–12	
24 Dec	Jin–Yue (China)	2–0	(Vietnam) Mãi–Yến	21–18	21–5	

==== Pool D ====
Pos	Team	Pld	W	L	Pts	SW	SL	SR	SPW	SPL	SPR
1	(China) Zhang–Ji	2	2	0	4	4	1	4.000	100	82	1.220
2	(Sri Lanka) Thakshila–Geethika	2	1	1	3	3	2	1.500	98	82	1.195
3	(Hong Kong) Mushroom–Mei	2	0	2	2	0	4	0.000	50	84	0.595

Source: Results

Date		Score		Set 1	Set 2	Set 3
23 Dec	Thakshila–Geethika (Sri Lanka)	2–0	(Hong Kong) Mushroom–Mei	21–10	21–14	
23 Dec	Zhang–Ji (China)	2–0	(Hong Kong) Mushroom–Mei	21–8	21–18	
24 Dec	Zhang–Ji (China)	2–1	(Sri Lanka) Thakshila–Geethika	21–19	21–23	16–14

==== Pool E ====
Pos	Team	Pld	W	L	Pts	SW	SL	SR	SPW	SPL	SPR
1	(Japan) Ozaki–Kusano	2	2	0	4	4	0	MAX	86	67	1.284
2	(Chinese Taipei) Kou–Chang	2	1	1	3	2	2	1.000	78	69	1.130
3	(Indonesia) Efa–Yokbeth	2	0	2	2	0	4	0.000	56	84	0.667

Source: Results

Date		Score		Set 1	Set 2	Set 3
23 Dec	Efa–Yokbeth (Indonesia)	0–2	(Chinese Taipei) Kou–Chang	11–21	14–21	
23 Dec	Ozaki–Kusano (Japan)	2–0	(Chinese Taipei) Kou–Chang	23–21	21–15	
24 Dec	Ozaki–Kusano (Japan)	2–0	(Indonesia) Efa–Yokbeth	21–17	21–14	

==== Pool F ====
Pos	Team	Pld	W	L	Pts	SW	SL	SR	SPW	SPL	SPR
1	(Thailand) Yupa–Kamoltip	1	1	0	2	2	0	MAX	42	29	1.448
2	(Philippines) Bautista–Brillo	1	0	1	1	0	2	0.000	29	42	0.690

Source: Results

Date		Score		Set 1	Set 2	Set 3
24 Dec	Yupa–Kamoltip (Thailand)	2–0	(Philippines) Bautista–Brillo	21–17	21–12	

==== Pool G ====
Pos	Team	Pld	W	L	Pts	SW	SL	SR	SPW	SPL	SPR
1	(Thailand) Tenpaksee–Sannok	1	1	0	2	2	0	MAX	42	33	1.273
2	(Kazakhstan) Mashkova–Tsimbalova	1	0	1	1	0	2	0.000	33	42	0.786

Source: Results

Date		Score		Set 1	Set 2	Set 3
24 Dec	Tenpaksee–Sannok (Thailand)	2–0	(Kazakhstan) Mashkova–Tsimbalova	21–17	21–16	

==== Pool H ====
Pos	Team	Pld	W	L	Pts	SW	SL	SR	SPW	SPL	SPR
1	(Kazakhstan) Bakhtygul–Marina	2	2	0	4	4	0	MAX	84	62	1.355
2	(Malaysia) Teck Hua–Shun Thing	2	1	1	3	2	2	1.000	76	65	1.169
3	(South Korea) Jung Ji-yong–Shin Mi-hwa	2	0	2	2	0	4	0.000	51	84	0.607

Source: Results

Date		Score		Set 1	Set 2	Set 3
23 Dec	Teck Hua–Shun Thing (Malaysia)	2–0	(South Korea) Jung Ji-yong–Shin Mi-hwa	21–13	21–10	
23 Dec	Bakhtygul–Marina (Kazakhstan)	2–0	(South Korea) Jung Ji-yong–Shin Mi-hwa	21–11	21–17	
24 Dec	Bakhtygul–Marina (Kazakhstan)	2–0	(Malaysia) Teck Hua–Shun Thing	21–18	21–16	

=== Knockout round ===
Round of 16; 25 December
(China) Xue–Zhang	16	21	15
(Kazakhstan) Mashkova–Tsimbalova	21	13	10
(Kazakhstan) Bakhtygul–Marina	24	21
(Sri Lanka) Thakshila–Geethika	22	12
(Japan) Ozaki–Kusano	21	21
(Vietnam) Mãi–Yến	15	12
(China) Zhang–Ji	14	16
(Philippines) Bautista–Brillo	21	21
(China) Jin–Yue	21	21
(Sri Lanka) Sewwandi–Sujeewa	4	11
(Thailand) Yupa–Kamoltip	19	21	16
(Malaysia) Teck Hua–Shun Thing	21	17	14
(Thailand) Tenpaksee–Sannok	21	21
(Vietnam) Hậu–Loan	12	9
(Japan) Tanaka–Mizoe	19	21	17
(Chinese Taipei) Kou–Chang	21	17	15

Quarterfinals; 25 December
(China) Xue–Zhang	21	21
(Kazakhstan) Bakhtygul–Marina	9	6
(Japan) Ozaki–Kusano	21	21
(Philippines) Bautista–Brillo	13	13
(China) Jin–Yue	21	21
(Thailand) Yupa–Kamoltip	8	18
(Thailand) Tenpaksee–Sannok	16	18
(Japan) Tanaka–Mizoe	21	21

Semifinals; 26 December
(China) Xue–Zhang	21	21
(Japan) Ozaki–Kusano	7	8
(China) Jin–Yue	21	21
(Japan) Tanaka–Mizoe	17	14

Final; 26 December
(China) Xue–Zhang	21	21
(China) Jin–Yue	18	11
3rd place
(Japan) Ozaki–Kusano	21	21
(Japan) Tanaka–Mizoe	17	19
