= 2013 Asian Beach Volleyball Championships =

International beach volleyball competition

- Location: Wuhan, China
- Dates: 7–10 November 2013

The 2013 Asian Beach Volleyball Championship was a beach volleyball event, that was held from November 7 to 10, 2013 in Wuhan, China.

== Medal summary ==
Event	Gold	Silver	Bronze
Men	Kazakhstan; Alexey Sidorenko; Alexandr Dyachenko	Thailand; Prathip Sukto; Sittichai Sangkhachot	China; Abuduhalikejiang Mutailipu; Li Jian
Women	China; Yue Yuan; Ma Yuanyuan	Thailand; Varapatsorn Radarong; Tanarattha Udomchavee	Kazakhstan; Tatyana Mashkova; Irina Tsimbalova

== Participating nations ==
=== Men ===
- Australia (1)
- China (3)
- Hong Kong (2)
- Iran (1)
- Japan (2)
- Kazakhstan (2)
- Malaysia (1)
- Thailand (2)

=== Women ===
- Australia (1)
- China (3)
- Hong Kong (2)
- Japan (2)
- Kazakhstan (2)
- Thailand (2)
- Vanuatu (2)

== Men's tournament ==
=== Preliminary round ===
==== Pool A ====
Pos	Team	Pld	W	L	Pts	SW	SL	SR	SPW	SPL	SPR
1	(Kazakhstan) Sidorenko–Dyachenko	2	2	0	4	4	0	MAX	84	60	1.400
2	(Iran) B. Salemi–Gholipouri	2	1	1	3	2	2	1.000	77	73	1.055
3	(Japan) Hasegawa–Takahashi	2	0	2	2	0	4	0.000	56	84	0.667

Source: AVC

Date		Score		Set 1	Set 2	Set 3
07 Nov	Hasegawa–Takahashi (Japan)	0–2	(Iran) B. Salemi–Gholipouri	17–21	14–21	
07 Nov	Sidorenko–Dyachenko (Kazakhstan)	2–0	(Iran) B. Salemi–Gholipouri	21–19	21–16	
08 Nov	Sidorenko–Dyachenko (Kazakhstan)	2–0	(Japan) Hasegawa–Takahashi	21–13	21–12	

==== Pool B ====
Pos	Team	Pld	W	L	Pts	SW	SL	SR	SPW	SPL	SPR
1	(China) Wu Jiaxin–Bao J.	2	2	0	4	4	1	4.000	93	86	1.081
2	(Kazakhstan) Yakovlev–Kuleshov	2	1	1	3	3	2	1.500	94	86	1.093
3	(Japan) Nakaya–Hatabe	2	0	2	2	0	4	0.000	69	84	0.821

Source: AVC

Date		Score		Set 1	Set 2	Set 3
07 Nov	Wu Jiaxin–Bao J. (China)	2–0	(Japan) Nakaya–Hatabe	21–18	21–16	
07 Nov	Yakovlev–Kuleshov (Kazakhstan)	2–0	(Japan) Nakaya–Hatabe	21–19	21–16	
08 Nov	Yakovlev–Kuleshov (Kazakhstan)	1–2	(China) Wu Jiaxin–Bao J.	21–15	18–21	13–15

==== Pool C ====
Pos	Team	Pld	W	L	Pts	SW	SL	SR	SPW	SPL	SPR
1	(China) Ha Likejiang–Li	3	3	0	6	6	0	MAX	126	92	1.370
2	(Thailand) Sukto–Sangkhachot	3	2	1	5	4	2	2.000	119	93	1.280
3	(Hong Kong) Alex–Chui	3	1	2	4	2	4	0.500	102	111	0.919
4	(Malaysia) Mohd Aizzat–Raja Nazmi	3	0	3	3	0	6	0.000	75	126	0.595

Source: AVC

Date		Score		Set 1	Set 2	Set 3
07 Nov	Sukto–Sangkhachot (Thailand)	2–0	(Malaysia) Mohd Aizzat–Raja Nazmi	21–14	21–8	
07 Nov	Ha Likejiang–Li (China)	2–0	(Hong Kong) Alex–Chui	21–18	21–13	
07 Nov	Sukto–Sangkhachot (Thailand)	2–0	(Hong Kong) Alex–Chui	21–12	21–13	
07 Nov	Ha Likejiang–Li (China)	2–0	(Malaysia) Mohd Aizzat–Raja Nazmi	21–14	21–12	
08 Nov	Sukto–Sangkhachot (Thailand)	0–2	(China) Ha Likejiang–Li	18–21	17–21	
08 Nov	Alex–Chui (Hong Kong)	2–0	(Malaysia) Mohd Aizzat–Raja Nazmi	21–14	21–13	

==== Pool D ====
Pos	Team	Pld	W	L	Pts	SW	SL	SR	SPW	SPL	SPR
1	(Australia) Boehm–Durant	3	3	0	6	6	1	6.000	140	112	1.250
2	(China) Ch. Chen–C. Yang	3	2	1	5	5	2	2.500	142	105	1.352
3	(Thailand) Chanchai–Niphon	3	1	2	4	2	4	0.500	96	114	0.842
4	(Hong Kong) Kelvin–Ho	3	0	3	3	0	6	0.000	79	126	0.627

Source: AVC

Date		Score		Set 1	Set 2	Set 3
07 Nov	Ch. Chen–C. Yang (China)	2–0	(Thailand) Chanchai–Niphon	21–12	21–13	
07 Nov	Boehm–Durant (Australia)	2–0	(Hong Kong) Kelvin–Ho	21–12	21–13	
07 Nov	Ch. Chen–C. Yang (China)	2–0	(Hong Kong) Kelvin–Ho	21–10	21–14	
07 Nov	Boehm–Durant (Australia)	2–0	(Thailand) Chanchai–Niphon	21–16	21–13	
08 Nov	Ch. Chen–C. Yang (China)	1–2	(Australia) Boehm–Durant	21–15	19–21	18–20
08 Nov	Kelvin–Ho (Hong Kong)	0–2	(Thailand) Chanchai–Niphon	13–21	17–21	

=== Knockout round ===
Round of 16; 9 November
(Japan) Hasegawa–Takahashi	21	14	19
(China) Ch. Chen–C. Yang	14	21	17
(Kazakhstan) Yakovlev–Kuleshov	21	21
(Hong Kong) Alex–Chui	14	18
(Malaysia) Mohd Aizzat–Raja Nazmi	15	14
(Australia) Boehm–Durant	21	21
(China) Ha Likejiang–Li	21	21
(Hong Kong) Kelvin–Ho	11	19
(Iran) B. Salemi–Gholipouri	21	21
(Japan) Nakaya–Hatabe	13	19
(Thailand) Sukto–Sangkhachot	21	21
(Thailand) Chanchai–Niphon	13	14

Quarterfinals; 9 November
(Kazakhstan) Sidorenko–Dyachenko	21	21
(Japan) Hasegawa–Takahashi	14	17
(Kazakhstan) Yakovlev–Kuleshov	17	22	15
(Australia) Boehm–Durant	21	20	12
(China) Ha Likejiang–Li	21	21
(Iran) B. Salemi–Gholipouri	19	12
(Thailand) Sukto–Sangkhachot	21	21
(China) Wu Jiaxin–Bao J.	17	14

Semifinals; 10 November
(Kazakhstan) Sidorenko–Dyachenko	21	21
(Kazakhstan) Yakovlev–Kuleshov	10	12
(China) Ha Likejiang–Li	18	14
(Thailand) Sukto–Sangkhachot	21	21

Final; 10 November
(Kazakhstan) Sidorenko–Dyachenko	21	21
(Thailand) Sukto–Sangkhachot	11	17
3rd place
(Kazakhstan) Yakovlev–Kuleshov	16	15
(China) Ha Likejiang–Li	21	21

== Women's tournament ==
=== Preliminary round ===
==== Pool A ====
Pos	Team	Pld	W	L	Pts	SW	SL	SR	SPW	SPL	SPR
1	(Kazakhstan) Mashkova–Tsimbalova	2	2	0	4	4	0	MAX	84	51	1.647
2	(Vanuatu) Joshua–Matauatu	2	1	1	3	2	3	0.667	80	84	0.952
3	(Thailand) Numwong–Hongpak	2	0	2	2	1	4	0.250	67	96	0.698

Source: AVC

Date		Score		Set 1	Set 2	Set 3
07 Nov	Numwong–Hongpak (Thailand)	1–2	(Vanuatu) Joshua–Matauatu	21–18	10–21	11–15
08 Nov	Mashkova–Tsimbalova (Kazakhstan)	2–0	(Vanuatu) Joshua–Matauatu	21–16	21–10	
08 Nov	Mashkova–Tsimbalova (Kazakhstan)	2–0	(Thailand) Numwong–Hongpak	21–13	21–12	

==== Pool B ====
Pos	Team	Pld	W	L	Pts	SW	SL	SR	SPW	SPL	SPR
1	(Thailand) Radarong–Udomchavee	3	3	0	6	6	0	MAX	126	79	1.595
2	(China) M.M. Lin–Tang N.Y.	3	2	1	5	4	2	2.000	117	102	1.147
3	(Hong Kong) Mei–Tin Lai	3	1	2	4	2	5	0.400	102	131	0.779
4	(Japan) Kusano–Ishitsubo	3	0	3	3	1	6	0.167	102	135	0.756

Source: AVC

Date		Score		Set 1	Set 2	Set 3
07 Nov	Radarong–Udomchavee (Thailand)	2–0	(China) M.M. Lin–Tang N.Y.	21–14	21–19	
07 Nov	Mei–Tin Lai (Hong Kong)	2–1	(Japan) Kusano–Ishitsubo	15–21	21–19	15–7
08 Nov	Radarong–Udomchavee (Thailand)	2–0	(Japan) Kusano–Ishitsubo	21–16	21–8	
08 Nov	Mei–Tin Lai (Hong Kong)	0–2	(China) M.M. Lin–Tang N.Y.	18–21	11–21	
08 Nov	Radarong–Udomchavee (Thailand)	2–0	(Hong Kong) Mei–Tin Lai	21–14	21–8	
08 Nov	Kusano–Ishitsubo (Japan)	0–2	(China) M.M. Lin–Tang N.Y.	14–21	17–21	

==== Pool C ====
Pos	Team	Pld	W	L	Pts	SW	SL	SR	SPW	SPL	SPR
1	(China) Wang Fan–Zh. Y.X.	2	1	1	3	3	2	1.500	100	94	1.064
2	(Australia) Artacho–Laird	2	1	1	3	2	2	1.000	81	78	1.038
3	(Vanuatu) Elwin–Iatika	2	1	1	3	2	3	0.667	90	99	0.909

Source: AVC

Date		Score		Set 1	Set 2	Set 3
07 Nov	Artacho–Laird (Australia)	0–2	(China) Wang Fan–Zh. Y.X.	19–21	20–22	
08 Nov	Elwin–Iatika (Vanuatu)	2–1	(China) Wang Fan–Zh. Y.X.	15–21	22–20	18–16
08 Nov	Elwin–Iatika (Vanuatu)	0–2	(Australia) Artacho–Laird	19–21	16–21	

==== Pool D ====
Pos	Team	Pld	W	L	Pts	SW	SL	SR	SPW	SPL	SPR
1	(China) Yue Y.–Y.Y. Ma	3	3	0	6	6	1	6.000	138	88	1.568
2	(Japan) Take–Mizoe	3	2	1	5	5	2	2.500	130	96	1.354
3	(Kazakhstan) Samalikova–Varassova	3	1	2	4	2	4	0.500	91	106	0.858
4	(Hong Kong) Lo–Yeung	3	0	3	3	0	6	0.000	57	126	0.452

Source: AVC

Date		Score		Set 1	Set 2	Set 3
07 Nov	Yue Y.–Y.Y. Ma (China)	2–0	(Hong Kong) Lo–Yeung	21–8	21–11	
07 Nov	Take–Mizoe (Japan)	2–0	(Kazakhstan) Samalikova–Varassova	21–12	21–14	
08 Nov	Yue Y.–Y.Y. Ma (China)	2–0	(Kazakhstan) Samalikova–Varassova	21–14	21–9	
08 Nov	Take–Mizoe (Japan)	2–0	(Hong Kong) Lo–Yeung	21–10	21–6	
08 Nov	Yue Y.–Y.Y. Ma (China)	2–1	(Japan) Take–Mizoe	18–21	21–18	15–7
08 Nov	Samalikova–Varassova (Kazakhstan)	2–0	(Hong Kong) Lo–Yeung	21–16	21–6	

=== Knockout round ===
Round of 16; 9 November
(Thailand) Numwong–Hongpak	21	15	7
(Japan) Take–Mizoe	13	21	15
(Australia) Artacho–Laird	17	21	15
(Hong Kong) Mei–Tin Lai	21	14	13
(Japan) Kusano–Ishitsubo	9	12
(China) Yue Y.–Y.Y. Ma	21	21
(China) Wang Fan–Zh. Y.X.	21	21
(Hong Kong) Lo–Yeung	7	11
(China) M.M. Lin–Tang N.Y.	5	14
(Vanuatu) Elwin–Iatika	21	21
(Vanuatu) Joshua–Matauatu	21	21
(Kazakhstan) Samalikova–Varassova	15	16

Quarterfinals; 9 November
(Kazakhstan) Mashkova–Tsimbalova	21	16	15
(Japan) Take–Mizoe	17	21	13
(Australia) Artacho–Laird	14	11
(China) Yue Y.–Y.Y. Ma	21	21
(China) Wang Fan–Zh. Y.X.	19	17
(Vanuatu) Elwin–Iatika	21	21
(Vanuatu) Joshua–Matauatu	21	15
(Thailand) Radarong–Udomchavee	23	21

Semifinals; 10 November
(Kazakhstan) Mashkova–Tsimbalova	17	21
(China) Yue Y.–Y.Y. Ma	21	23
(Vanuatu) Elwin–Iatika	19	21	11
(Thailand) Radarong–Udomchavee	21	12	15

Final; 10 November
(China) Yue Y.–Y.Y. Ma	21	21
(Thailand) Radarong–Udomchavee	16	18
3rd place
(Kazakhstan) Mashkova–Tsimbalova	21	18	15
(Vanuatu) Elwin–Iatika	18	21	9
