= Beach volleyball at the 2010 Asian Games – Women's tournament =

Women at the 2010 Asian Games
- Venue: Asian Games Beach Volleyball Venue
- Date: 15–23 November 2010
- Competitors: 32 from 10 nations

Medalists
gold medal	Xue Chen; Zhang Xi	China
silver medal	Huang Ying; Yue Yuan	China
bronze medal	Usa Tenpaksee; Jarunee Sannok	Thailand

The women's beach volleyball tournament at the 2010 Asian Games was held from November 15 to November 23, 2010 in Guangzhou, China.

During the preliminary round, in case of a tie between three teams in the pools the top ranked team was determined by the points ratios in the matches between the three tied teams. The second ranked team was determined by the head-to-head match result between the two remaining teams.

== Schedule ==
All times are China Standard Time (UTC+08:00)

Date	Time	Event
Monday, 15 November 2010	11:00	Preliminary round 1
Tuesday, 16 November 2010	11:00	Preliminary round 2
Tuesday, 16 November 2010	21:00	Preliminary round 1
Wednesday, 17 November 2010	13:00	Preliminary round 2
Thursday, 18 November 2010	10:00	Preliminary round 3
Friday, 19 November 2010	11:00	Preliminary round 3
Saturday, 20 November 2010	10:00	Round of 16
Sunday, 21 November 2010	11:00	Quarterfinals
Monday, 22 November 2010	17:00	Semifinals
Tuesday, 23 November 2010	19:00	Bronze medal match
Tuesday, 23 November 2010	20:00	Gold medal match

== Results ==
=== Preliminary ===
==== Pool A ====
Pos	Team	Pld	W	L	Pts	SPW	SPL	SPR	SW	SL	SR	Qualification
1	Xue–Zhang (CHN)	3	3	0	6	126	54	2.333	6	0	MAX	Round of 16
2	Issayeva–Rakhmatulina (KAZ)	3	2	1	5	106	108	0.981	4	2	2.000	Round of 16
3	Tse–Kong (HKG)	3	1	2	4	102	132	0.773	2	5	0.400	Round of 16
4	Lee–Lee (KOR)	3	0	3	3	99	139	0.712	1	6	0.167	Round of 16

Source: Results

Date		Score		Set 1	Set 2	Set 3
15 Nov	Xue–Zhang (CHN)	2–0	Issayeva–Rakhmatulina (KAZ)	21–10	21–12	
15 Nov	Tse–Kong (HKG)	2–1	Lee–Lee (KOR)	19–21	21–17	15–10
16 Nov	Xue–Zhang (CHN)	2–0	Lee–Lee (KOR)	21–7	21–9	
16 Nov	Tse–Kong (HKG)	0–2	Issayeva–Rakhmatulina (KAZ)	19–21	12–21	
18 Nov	Xue–Zhang (CHN)	2–0	Tse–Kong (HKG)	21–6	21–10	
18 Nov	Issayeva–Rakhmatulina (KAZ)	2–0	Lee–Lee (KOR)	21–16	21–19	

==== Pool B ====
Pos	Team	Pld	W	L	Pts	SPW	SPL	SPR	SW	SL	SR	Qualification
1	Huang–Yue (CHN)	3	2	1	5 (Note: Head-to-head set points ratio: CHN 1.095, JPN 1.027, MAS 0.891. JPN and MAS were ranked by their head-to-head result: JPN 2–0 MAS.)	134	91	1.473	5	2	2.500	Round of 16
2	Tanaka–Mizoe (JPN)	3	2	1	5	117	90	1.300	4	2	2.000	Round of 16
3	Luk–Beh (MAS)	3	2	1	5	124	104	1.192	4	3	1.333	Round of 16
4	Xavier–dos Santos (TLS)	3	0	3	3	36	126	0.286	0	6	0.000	Round of 16

Source: Results
Notes:

Date		Score		Set 1	Set 2	Set 3
15 Nov	Huang–Yue (CHN)	1–2	Luk–Beh (MAS)	21–15	17–21	12–15
15 Nov	Tanaka–Mizoe (JPN)	2–0	Xavier–dos Santos (TLS)	21–7	21–10	
17 Nov	Tanaka–Mizoe (JPN)	2–0	Luk–Beh (MAS)	21–17	21–14	
17 Nov	Huang–Yue (CHN)	2–0	Xavier–dos Santos (TLS)	21–2	21–5	
19 Nov	Huang–Yue (CHN)	2–0	Tanaka–Mizoe (JPN)	21–17	21–16	
19 Nov	Luk–Beh (MAS)	2–0	Xavier–dos Santos (TLS)	21–5	21–7	

==== Pool C ====
Pos	Team	Pld	W	L	Pts	SPW	SPL	SPR	SW	SL	SR	Qualification
1	Urata–Nishibori (JPN)	3	3	0	6	126	90	1.400	6	0	MAX	Round of 16
2	Kou–Chang (TPE)	3	2	1	5	125	99	1.263	4	2	2.000	Round of 16
3	Phokongploy–Kulna (THA)	3	1	2	4	119	112	1.063	2	4	0.500	Round of 16
4	Lakmini–Sandamali (SRI)	3	0	3	3	57	126	0.452	0	6	0.000	Round of 16

Source: Results

Date		Score		Set 1	Set 2	Set 3
15 Nov	Phokongploy–Kulna (THA)	0–2	Urata–Nishibori (JPN)	16–21	18–21	
15 Nov	Kou–Chang (TPE)	2–0	Lakmini–Sandamali (SRI)	21–7	21–7	
16 Nov	Phokongploy–Kulna (THA)	2–0	Lakmini–Sandamali (SRI)	21–9	21–13	
16 Nov	Kou–Chang (TPE)	0–2	Urata–Nishibori (JPN)	17–21	18–21	
18 Nov	Phokongploy–Kulna (THA)	0–2	Kou–Chang (TPE)	25–27	18–21	
18 Nov	Urata–Nishibori (JPN)	2–0	Lakmini–Sandamali (SRI)	21–6	21–15	

==== Pool D ====
Pos	Team	Pld	W	L	Pts	SPW	SPL	SPR	SW	SL	SR	Qualification
1	Tenpaksee–Sannok (THA)	3	3	0	6	138	92	1.500	6	1	6.000	Round of 16
2	Mashkova–Tsimbalova (KAZ)	3	2	1	5	133	93	1.430	5	2	2.500	Round of 16
3	Gunawardena–Wijesinghe (SRI)	3	1	2	4	98	133	0.737	2	5	0.400	Round of 16
4	Lee–Kwak (KOR)	3	0	3	3	88	139	0.633	1	6	0.167	Round of 16

Source: Results

Date		Score		Set 1	Set 2	Set 3
16 Nov	Mashkova–Tsimbalova (KAZ)	2–0	Lee–Kwak (KOR)	21–8	21–6	
16 Nov	Tenpaksee–Sannok (THA)	2–0	Gunawardena–Wijesinghe (SRI)	21–7	21–11	
17 Nov	Mashkova–Tsimbalova (KAZ)	2–0	Gunawardena–Wijesinghe (SRI)	21–12	21–13	
17 Nov	Tenpaksee–Sannok (THA)	2–0	Lee–Kwak (KOR)	21–11	21–14	
19 Nov	Gunawardena–Wijesinghe (SRI)	2–1	Lee–Kwak (KOR)	21–15	19–21	15–13
19 Nov	Tenpaksee–Sannok (THA)	2–1	Mashkova–Tsimbalova (KAZ)	21–16	18–21	15–12

=== Knockout round ===
Round of 16
Xue–Zhang (CHN)	21	21
Lee–Kwak (KOR)	7	7
Gunawardena–Wijesinghe (SRI)	9	10
Kou–Chang (TPE)	21	21
Issayeva–Rakhmatulina (KAZ)	12	17
Phokongploy–Kulna (THA)	21	21
Lee–Lee (KOR)	11	12
Tenpaksee–Sannok (THA)	21	21
Urata–Nishibori (JPN)	21	21
Xavier–dos Santos (TLS)	1	3
Luk–Beh (MAS)	21	21
Mashkova–Tsimbalova (KAZ)	19	15
Tanaka–Mizoe (JPN)	21	21
Tse–Kong (HKG)	17	14
Lakmini–Sandamali (SRI)	3	10
Huang–Yue (CHN)	21	21

Quarterfinals
Xue–Zhang (CHN)	18	21	15
Kou–Chang (TPE)	21	12	9
Phokongploy–Kulna (THA)	22	18	12
Tenpaksee–Sannok (THA)	20	21	15
Urata–Nishibori (JPN)	15	27
Luk–Beh (MAS)	21	29
Tanaka–Mizoe (JPN)	16	19
Huang–Yue (CHN)	21	21

Semifinals
Xue–Zhang (CHN)	21	21
Tenpaksee–Sannok (THA)	16	14
Luk–Beh (MAS)	7	13
Huang–Yue (CHN)	21	21

Gold medal match
Xue–Zhang (CHN)	21	21
Huang–Yue (CHN)	14	13
Bronze medal match
Tenpaksee–Sannok (THA)	21	21
Luk–Beh (MAS)	18	14

== Final standing ==
Rank	Team	Pld	W	L
1st place, gold medalist(s)	Xue Chen – Zhang Xi (CHN)	7	7	0
2nd place, silver medalist(s)	Huang Ying – Yue Yuan (CHN)	7	5	2
3rd place, bronze medalist(s)	Usa Tenpaksee – Jarunee Sannok (THA)	7	6	1
4	Luk Teck Hua – Beh Shun Thing (MAS)	7	4	3
5	Shinako Tanaka – Sayaka Mizoe (JPN)	5	3	2
5	Satoko Urata – Takemi Nishibori (JPN)	5	4	1
5	Yupa Phokongploy – Kamoltip Kulna (THA)	5	2	3
5	Kou Nai-han – Chang Hui-min (TPE)	5	3	2
9	Tse Wing Hung – Kong Cheuk Yee (HKG)	4	1	3
9	Lyudmila Issayeva – Inna Rakhmatulina (KAZ)	4	2	2
9	Tatyana Mashkova – Irina Tsimbalova (KAZ)	4	2	2
9	Lee Sun-hwa – Kwak Mi-jung (KOR)	4	0	4
9	Lee Hyun-jung – Lee Eun-a (KOR)	4	0	4
9	Nirosha Lakmini – Leena Sandamali (SRI)	4	0	4
9	Geethika Gunawardena – Sujeewa Wijesinghe (SRI)	4	1	3
9	Aliança Xavier – Mariana dos Santos (TLS)	4	0	4
