= Beach volleyball at the 2014 Asian Games – Women's tournament =

Women at the 2014 Asian Games
- Venue: Songdo Beach Volleyball Venue
- Date: 20–28 September 2014
- Competitors: 22 from 7 nations

Medalists
gold medal	Ma Yuanyuan; Xia Xinyi	China
silver medal	Tanarattha Udomchavee; Varapatsorn Radarong	Thailand
bronze medal	Wang Fan; Yue Yuan	China

The women's beach volleyball tournament at the 2014 Asian Games was held from September 20 to September 28, 2014 in Incheon, South Korea.

== Schedule ==
All times are Korea Standard Time (UTC+09:00)

Date	Time	Event
Saturday, 20 September 2014	09:00	Preliminary round 1
Sunday, 21 September 2014	13:00	Preliminary round 1
Monday, 22 September 2014	13:00	Preliminary round 2
Tuesday, 23 September 2014	14:00	Preliminary round 2
Wednesday, 24 September 2014	09:00	Preliminary round 3
Thursday, 25 September 2014	09:00	Round of 16
Friday, 26 September 2014	11:00	Quarterfinals
Saturday, 27 September 2014	15:00	Semifinals
Sunday, 28 September 2014	14:00	Bronze medal match
Sunday, 28 September 2014	15:00	Gold medal match

== Results ==
=== Preliminary ===
==== Pool A ====
Pos	Team	Pld	W	L	Pts	SW	SL	SR	SPW	SPL	SPR	Qualification
1	Wang–Yue (CHN)	1	1	0	2	2	0	MAX	42	11	3.818	Quarterfinals
2	Nazirova–Dilovarshoeva (TJK)	1	0	1	1	0	2	0.000	11	42	0.262	Round of 16

Source: AVC

Date		Score		Set 1	Set 2	Set 3
23 Sep	Wang–Yue (CHN)	2–0	Nazirova–Dilovarshoeva (TJK)	21–2	21–9	

==== Pool B ====
Pos	Team	Pld	W	L	Pts	SW	SL	SR	SPW	SPL	SPR	Qualification
1	Udomchavee–Radarong (THA)	2	2	0	4	4	1	4.000	92	72	1.278	Quarterfinals
2	Murakami–Habaguchi (JPN)	2	1	1	3	3	3	1.000	101	91	1.110	Round of 16
3	Ng–Wong (HKG)	2	0	2	2	1	4	0.250	67	97	0.691	Round of 16

Source: AVC

Date		Score		Set 1	Set 2	Set 3
20 Sep	Udomchavee–Radarong (THA)	2–1	Murakami–Habaguchi (JPN)	14–21	21–18	15–7
22 Sep	Udomchavee–Radarong (THA)	2–0	Ng–Wong (HKG)	21–16	21–10	
24 Sep	Ng–Wong (HKG)	1–2	Murakami–Habaguchi (JPN)	14–21	21–19	6–15

==== Pool C ====
Pos	Team	Pld	W	L	Pts	SW	SL	SR	SPW	SPL	SPR	Qualification
1	Phokongploy–Tenpaksee (THA)	2	2	0	4	4	1	4.000	100	94	1.064	Quarterfinals
2	Mashkova–Tsimbalova (KAZ)	2	1	1	3	3	2	1.500	95	76	1.250	Quarterfinals
3	Lee–Yoon (KOR)	2	0	2	2	0	4	0.000	62	87	0.713	Round of 16

Source: AVC

Date		Score		Set 1	Set 2	Set 3
20 Sep	Mashkova–Tsimbalova (KAZ)	2–0	Lee–Yoon (KOR)	21–6	21–15	
22 Sep	Mashkova–Tsimbalova (KAZ)	1–2	Phokongploy–Tenpaksee (THA)	21–15	15–21	17–19
24 Sep	Phokongploy–Tenpaksee (THA)	2–0	Lee–Yoon (KOR)	22–20	23–21	

==== Pool D ====
Pos	Team	Pld	W	L	Pts	SW	SL	SR	SPW	SPL	SPR	Qualification
1	Ma–Xia (CHN)	2	2	0	4	4	0	MAX	84	44	1.909	Quarterfinals
2	Kusano–Fujii (JPN)	2	1	1	3	2	2	1.000	70	70	1.000	Round of 16
3	Kim–Jeon (KOR)	2	0	2	2	0	4	0.000	44	84	0.524	Round of 16

Source: AVC

Date		Score		Set 1	Set 2	Set 3
21 Sep	Ma–Xia (CHN)	2–0	Kim–Jeon (KOR)	21–7	21–9	
23 Sep	Ma–Xia (CHN)	2–0	Kusano–Fujii (JPN)	21–10	21–18	
24 Sep	Kusano–Fujii (JPN)	2–0	Kim–Jeon (KOR)	21–13	21–15	

==== Second-placed teams ====
Pos	Team	Pld	W	L	Pts	SW	SL	SR	SPW	SPL	SPR	Qualification
1	Mashkova–Tsimbalova (KAZ)	2	1	1	3	3	2	1.500	95	76	1.250	Quarterfinals
2	Murakami–Habaguchi (JPN)	2	1	1	3	3	3	1.000	101	91	1.110	Round of 16
3	Kusano–Fujii (JPN)	2	1	1	3	2	2	1.000	70	70	1.000	Round of 16
4	Nazirova–Dilovarshoeva (TJK)	1	0	1	1	0	2	0.000	11	42	0.262	Round of 16

Source: AVC

=== Knockout round ===
Round of 16
Lee–Yoon (KOR)	21	21
Nazirova–Dilovarshoeva (TJK)	3	4
Kim–Jeon (KOR)	12	13
Murakami–Habaguchi (JPN)	21	21
Kusano–Fujii (JPN)	21	21
Ng–Wong (HKG)	17	7

Quarterfinals
Wang–Yue (CHN)	21	21
Lee–Yoon (KOR)	11	9
Mashkova–Tsimbalova (KAZ)	14	23	13
Ma–Xia (CHN)	21	21	15
Phokongploy–Tenpaksee (THA)	22	21
Murakami–Habaguchi (JPN)	20	11
Kusano–Fujii (JPN)	12	7
Udomchavee–Radarong (THA)	21	21

Semifinals
Wang–Yue (CHN)	20	21
Ma–Xia (CHN)	22	23
Phokongploy–Tenpaksee (THA)	21	11	13
Udomchavee–Radarong (THA)	17	21	15

Gold medal match
Ma–Xia (CHN)	21	21
Udomchavee–Radarong (THA)	12	18
Bronze medal match
Wang–Yue (CHN)	21	21
Phokongploy–Tenpaksee (THA)	14	11

== Final standing ==
Rank	Team	Pld	W	L
1st place, gold medalist(s)	Ma Yuanyuan – Xia Xinyi (CHN)	5	5	0
2nd place, silver medalist(s)	Tanarattha Udomchavee – Varapatsorn Radarong (THA)	5	4	1
3rd place, bronze medalist(s)	Wang Fan – Yue Yuan (CHN)	4	3	1
4	Yupa Phokongploy – Usa Tenpaksee (THA)	5	3	2
5	Ayumi Kusano – Sakurako Fujii (JPN)	4	2	2
5	Megumi Murakami – Erika Habaguchi (JPN)	4	2	2
5	Tatyana Mashkova – Irina Tsimbalova (KAZ)	3	1	2
5	Lee Eun-a – Yoon Hye-suk (KOR)	4	1	3
9	Ng Tin Lai – Wong Yuen Mei (HKG)	3	0	3
9	Kim Ka-yeon – Jeon Ha-nel (KOR)	3	0	3
9	Shahnoza Nazirova – Malika Dilovarshoeva (TJK)	2	0	2
