= Xue Chen =

Chinese beach volleyball player

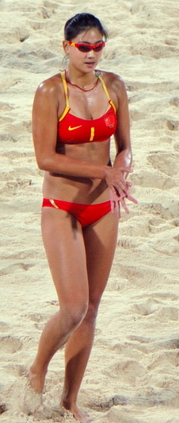
- Chen at the 2008 Summer Olympics

Personal information
- Born: 18 February 1989 (age 37); Fuzhou, Fujian, China
- Height: 191 cm (6 ft 3 in)
Honours
Women's beach volleyball
Representing China
Olympic Games
| Bronze medal – third place | 2008 Beijing | Beach |
World Championships
| Gold medal – first place | 2013 Stare Jabłonki | Beach |
| Bronze medal – third place | 2011 Rome | Beach |
Asian Games
| Gold medal – first place | 2006 Doha | Beach |
| Gold medal – first place | 2010 Guangzhou | Beach |
| Gold medal – first place | 2022 Hangzhou | Beach |
Asian Championships
| Gold medal – first place | 2009 Haikou | Beach |
| Gold medal – first place | 2010 Haikou | Beach |
| Gold medal – first place | 2011 Haikou | Beach |
| Gold medal – first place | 2012 Haikou | Beach |
| Gold medal – first place | 2016 Sydney | Beach |
| Gold medal – first place | 2023 Fuzhou | Beach |
| Silver medal – second place | 2018 Satun | Beach |
| Silver medal – second place | 2024 Santa Rosa | Beach |
| Bronze medal – third place | 2014 Jinjiang | Beach |

Xue Chen (Chinese: 薛晨; pinyin: Xuē Chén; born 18 February 1989) is a Chinese beach volleyball player. A 4-time Olympian, she won the bronze medal alongside Zhang Xi at the women's beach volleyball tournament of the 2008 Summer Olympics. In 2013, she won the gold medal also with Zhang at the FIVB Beach Volleyball World Championships, the first and only Asian team to do so.

Her hometown is Fuzhou, but she trains in Sanya, Hainan. She has also trained in California under coach Dane Selznick.

== Early life and career ==
Xue began playing basketball as a child, but disliked the physical contact of that sport. She then played indoor volleyball from the age of 10 to 13 before settling into beach volleyball. She began training for her sports career in 2000 at the Fuzhou Sports Training School after she caught the attention of coach Zhou Guoqin, who immediately recruited her to the team and began to train her in indoor volleyball after she already had grown to 167 cm. In 2002, she attended the Athletic Sports College of Fuzhou and became a member of the Chinese national beach volleyball team. Xue then made her Swatch-FIVB World Tour debut in 2005, playing in two events with You Wenhui and winning the FIVB Top Rookie award for 2006.

On 28 May 2006, Xue teamed up with Zhang Xi for the first time and became the youngest player to ever win a major event, when the 17-year-old won the $400,000 China Shanghai Jinshan Open.

Later in 2006, Xue and Zhang won the gold medal in the women's team competition at the Doha Asian Games. The pair also won the bronze medal in women's beach volleyball at the 2008 Summer Olympics in Beijing.

The pair had great success in 2010, which included winning the Grand Slam in Moscow, Russia, for the second time. They also achieved an extraordinary gold medal win on the FIVB World Tour Women's Final in Åland, Finland, by snapping the record gold-medal winning-streak of Brazil's França–Silva duo on 21 August 2010. In 2009, they won the gold medal at the Asian Beach Volleyball Championships in Haikou, China, and retained the title in 2010. They then went on to win more golds at the Sanya Open in Hainan, the Guangzhou Asian Games, and the Asian Beach Games in Muscat, Oman. The team of Xue and Zhang were ranked 4th overall on the 2010 FIVB Beach Volleyball World Rankings and finished the season ranked 1st in the FIVB World Rankings.

Xue and Zhang represented China in the 2012 London Olympics and settled at 4th place. Xue also competed at the 2020 Tokyo Olympics with Wang Xinxin held in 2021 and at the 2024 Paris Olympics with Xia Xinyi and placed at 9th.

== Playing partners ==
- Yan Ni (2003–2006)
- You Wenhui (2005)
- Zhang Xi (2006–2013)
- Zhang Ying (2008–2009)
- Xia Xinyi (2013–present)
- Ma Yuanyuan (2017)
- Wang Xinxin (2020–2021)

== See also ==
- China at the 2008 Summer Olympics#Volleyball
- Beach volleyball at the 2008 Summer Olympics – Women's tournament

Awards
| Preceded by Talita Antunes (BRA) | Women's FIVB World Tour "Top Rookie"; 2006 | Succeeded by April Ross (USA) |
