= Zhang Xi (beach volleyball) =

Chinese beach volleyball player

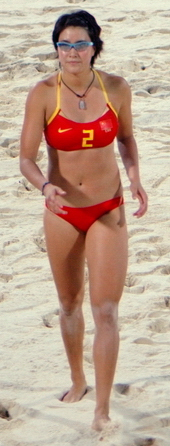
- Xi at the 2008 Summer Olympics

Personal information
- Born: 19 April 1985 (age 41) Nantong, Jiangsu, China
- Height: 183 cm (6 ft 0 in)
Honours
Women's beach volleyball
Representing China
Olympic Games
Bronze medal – third place	2008 Beijing	Beach
World Championships
Gold medal – first place	2013 Stare Jabłonki	Beach
Bronze medal – third place	2011 Rome	Beach
Asian Games
Gold medal – first place	2006 Doha	Beach
Gold medal – first place	2010 Guangzhou	Beach
Asian Championships
Gold medal – first place	2009 Haikou	Beach
Gold medal – first place	2010 Haikou	Beach
Gold medal – first place	2011 Haikou	Beach
Gold medal – first place	2012 Haikou	Beach
Silver medal – second place	2004 Lianyungang	Beach

Zhang Xi (simplified Chinese: 张希; traditional Chinese: 張希; pinyin: Zhāng Xī; born 19 April 1985) is a Chinese beach volleyball player. She won the bronze medal in the women's team competition at the 2008 Summer Olympics, and the gold medal at the 2013 Beach Volleyball World Championships, partnering with Xue Chen.

In 2004, she moved on to start playing full-time in the Swatch FIVB World Tour. In 2006, she began to team up with Xue Chen in the SWATCH tournament season. After finishing the tournament she went back to study at the Physical Education Unit of Jiangsu Province in China.

In 2008, Zhang was named as the FIVB Most Outstanding Player.

The duo of Zhang and Xue won a gold medal from the FIVB World Tour Women's Final in Åland, Finland on 21 August 2010. On the same day, they broke the winning streak of Brazil's França–Silva duo. In 2010, Zhang and Xue came 4th on the FIVB Beach Volleyball World Rankings. In 2011, Zhang was awarded the title of FIVB Best Defensive Player. The duo once again competed at the 2012 Summer Olympics and settled at 4th place.

== Playing partners ==
- Xue Chen
- Hu Xiaoyan
- Ji Linjun
- Tian Jia
- Pan Wang

== See also ==
- China at the 2008 Summer Olympics#Volleyball
- Beach volleyball at the 2012 Summer Olympics – Women's tournament

Awards
Preceded by Larissa França (BRA)	Women's FIVB World Tour "Best Defender"; 2010	Succeeded by Misty May-Treanor (USA)
Preceded by Kerri Walsh (USA)	Women's FIVB World Tour "Most Outstanding" alongside (United States) Misty May-Treanor; 2008	Succeeded by Juliana Felisberta (BRA)
