= Henriette Iatika =

Vanuatuan beach volleyball player

Personal information
- National team: Vanuatu
- Born: 19 June 1985 (age 41) Tanna
- Height: 171 cm (5 ft 7 in)
- Weight: 78 kg (172 lb)

Sport
- Sport: Beach Volleyball
- Partners: Miller Elwin (2007-2014), Joyce Joshua (2013)

Henriette Iatika (born 19 June 1985) is a beach volleyball player from Vanuatu.

== Life and career ==
Iatika was born in 1985 in Tanna, Vanuatu and currently resides in Port Villa.

Iatika's first beach volleyball competition was in the 2006 Vanuatu Open, following which she was selected for the national team. Playing with Miller Elwin, she won silver in the 2007 Oceania Championship in Samoa and bronze in the South Pacific Games, also in 2007.

In 2008 she won bronze at the U23 Championship in Australia and, with Miller Elwin, she placed third at the Queensland Open. She played in her first Swatch FIVB World Tour in March 2008 in Adelaide, Australia and won gold in the 2008 Oceania Championship in Tonga.

In 2012 she won the silver medal (with Miller Elwin) at the Asian Beach Volleyball Championship. She won gold, with Joyce Joshua, at the 2012 Oceania Beach Volleyball Championships.

In 2013 Iatika and Elwin competed together in the Asian Beach Volleyball Championship and the Beach Volleyball World Championships, placing 37th.

Iatika has been the team captain for the Vanuatu national beach volleyball team and currently holds a coaching role for the Vanuatu Pacific Games team.
