= Beach volleyball at the 2014 Asian Games – Men's tournament =

Men at the 2014 Asian Games
- Venue: Songdo Beach Volleyball Venue
- Date: 20–29 September 2014
- Competitors: 62 from 18 nations

Medalists
gold medal	Alexey Sidorenko; Alexandr Dyachenko	Kazakhstan
silver medal	Chen Cheng; Li Jian	China
bronze medal	Bao Jian; Abuduhalikejiang Mutailipu	China

The men's beach volleyball tournament at the 2014 Asian Games was held from September 20 to September 29, 2014 in Incheon, South Korea.

== Schedule ==
All times are Korea Standard Time (UTC+09:00)

Date	Time	Event
Saturday, 20 September 2014	10:00	Preliminary round 1
Sunday, 21 September 2014	09:00	Preliminary round 1
Monday, 22 September 2014	09:00	Preliminary round 2
Tuesday, 23 September 2014	09:00	Preliminary round 3
Tuesday, 23 September 2014	11:00	Preliminary round 2
Wednesday, 24 September 2014	11:00	Preliminary round 3
Thursday, 25 September 2014	12:00	Round of 16
Friday, 26 September 2014	09:00	Quarterfinals
Saturday, 27 September 2014	13:00	Semifinals
Monday, 29 September 2014	14:00	Bronze medal match
Monday, 29 September 2014	15:00	Gold medal match

== Results ==
Legend

- Ret — Retired

=== Preliminary ===
==== Pool A ====
Pos	Team	Pld	W	L	Pts	SW	SL	SR	SPW	SPL	SPR	Qualification
1	Sidorenko–Dyachenko (KAZ)	2	2	0	4	4	0	MAX	84	44	1.909	Round of 16
2	Nordin–Mahadi (MAS)	2	1	1	3	2	2	1.000	64	74	0.865	Round of 16
3	Al-Subhi–Al-Hashmi (OMA)	2	0	2	2	0	4	0.000	54	84	0.643	

Source: AVC

Date		Score		Set 1	Set 2	Set 3
20 Sep	Sidorenko–Dyachenko (KAZ)	2–0	Al-Subhi–Al-Hashmi (OMA)	21–10	21–12	
22 Sep	Sidorenko–Dyachenko (KAZ)	2–0	Nordin–Mahadi (MAS)	21–9	21–13	
23 Sep	Nordin–Mahadi (MAS)	2–0	Al-Subhi–Al-Hashmi (OMA)	21–13	21–19	

==== Pool B ====
Pos	Team	Pld	W	L	Pts	SW	SL	SR	SPW	SPL	SPR	Qualification
1	Santos–Pereira (QAT)	3	3	0	6	6	0	MAX	128	92	1.391	Round of 16
2	Perera–Rathnapala (SRI)	3	2	1	5	4	3	1.333	132	119	1.109	Round of 16
3	Sim–Lim (CAM)	3	1	2	4	3	4	0.750	132	131	1.008	
4	Biswas–Hossain (BAN)	3	0	3	3	0	6	0.000	76	126	0.603	

Source: AVC

Date		Score		Set 1	Set 2	Set 3
21 Sep	Perera–Rathnapala (SRI)	2–1	Sim–Lim (CAM)	23–21	18–21	15–12
21 Sep	Santos–Pereira (QAT)	2–0	Biswas–Hossain (BAN)	21–10	21–12	
22 Sep	Santos–Pereira (QAT)	2–0	Perera–Rathnapala (SRI)	21–19	21–15	
22 Sep	Biswas–Hossain (BAN)	0–2	Sim–Lim (CAM)	13–21	18–21	
24 Sep	Santos–Pereira (QAT)	2–0	Sim–Lim (CAM)	23–21	21–15	
24 Sep	Perera–Rathnapala (SRI)	2–0	Biswas–Hossain (BAN)	21–14	21–9	

==== Pool C ====
Pos	Team	Pld	W	L	Pts	SW	SL	SR	SPW	SPL	SPR	Qualification
1	Chen–Li (CHN)	3	3	0	6	6	0	MAX	135	93	1.452	Round of 16
2	Santosa–Fahriansyah (INA)	3	2	1	5	4	3	1.333	122	121	1.008	Round of 16
3	Kumara–Ekanayaka (SRI)	3	1	2	4	3	5	0.600	149	149	1.000	
4	Mohammad–Safi (AFG)	3	0	3	3	1	6	0.167	96	139	0.691	

Source: AVC

Date		Score		Set 1	Set 2	Set 3
21 Sep	Santosa–Fahriansyah (INA)	2–1	Kumara–Ekanayaka (SRI)	14–21	21–18	15–10
21 Sep	Chen–Li (CHN)	2–0	Mohammad–Safi (AFG)	21–10	21–8	
22 Sep	Chen–Li (CHN)	2–0	Santosa–Fahriansyah (INA)	21–17	21–13	
22 Sep	Mohammad–Safi (AFG)	1–2	Kumara–Ekanayaka (SRI)	21–19	17–21	10–15
24 Sep	Santosa–Fahriansyah (INA)	2–0	Mohammad–Safi (AFG)	21–12	21–18	
24 Sep	Chen–Li (CHN)	2–0	Kumara–Ekanayaka (SRI)	21–17	30–28	

==== Pool D ====
Pos	Team	Pld	W	L	Pts	SW	SL	SR	SPW	SPL	SPR	Qualification
1	Kuleshov–Yakovlev (KAZ)	3	3	0	6	6	0	MAX	127	93	1.366	Round of 16
2	Chui–Wong (HKG)	3	2	1	5	4	2	2.000	116	101	1.149	Round of 16
3	Moon–Lee (KOR)	3	1	2	4	2	5	0.400	111	131	0.847	
4	Abdul Wahid–Naseer (MDV)	3	0	3	3	1	6	0.167	107	136	0.787	

Source: AVC

Date		Score		Set 1	Set 2	Set 3
20 Sep	Kuleshov–Yakovlev (KAZ)	2–0	Abdul Wahid–Naseer (MDV)	21–14	21–16	
20 Sep	Chui–Wong (HKG)	2–0	Moon–Lee (KOR)	21–15	21–13	
22 Sep	Abdul Wahid–Naseer (MDV)	1–2	Moon–Lee (KOR)	21–16	13–21	12–15
22 Sep	Kuleshov–Yakovlev (KAZ)	2–0	Chui–Wong (HKG)	21–15	21–17	
23 Sep	Kuleshov–Yakovlev (KAZ)	2–0	Moon–Lee (KOR)	21–11	22–20	
23 Sep	Chui–Wong (HKG)	2–0	Abdul Wahid–Naseer (MDV)	21–15	21–16	

==== Pool E ====
Pos	Team	Pld	W	L	Pts	SW	SL	SR	SPW	SPL	SPR	Qualification
1	Bao–Abuduhalikejiang (CHN)	3	3	0	6	6	1	6.000	143	112	1.277	Round of 16
2	Murakami–Takahashi (JPN)	3	2	1	5	5	2	2.500	139	112	1.241	Round of 16
3	Saifuddin–Zokri (MAS)	3	1	2	4	2	4	0.500	98	112	0.875	
4	Xavier–Correia (TLS)	3	0	3	3	0	6	0.000	82	126	0.651	

Source: AVC

Date		Score		Set 1	Set 2	Set 3
21 Sep	Saifuddin–Zokri (MAS)	0–2	Murakami–Takahashi (JPN)	12–21	13–21	
21 Sep	Bao–Abuduhalikejiang (CHN)	2–0	Xavier–Correia (TLS)	21–15	21–11	
23 Sep	Bao–Abuduhalikejiang (CHN)	2–0	Saifuddin–Zokri (MAS)	21–17	21–14	
23 Sep	Xavier–Correia (TLS)	0–2	Murakami–Takahashi (JPN)	18–21	10–21	
24 Sep	Bao–Abuduhalikejiang (CHN)	2–1	Murakami–Takahashi (JPN)	19–21	25–23	15–11
24 Sep	Saifuddin–Zokri (MAS)	2–0	Xavier–Correia (TLS)	21–15	21–13	

==== Pool F ====
Pos	Team	Pld	W	L	Pts	SW	SL	SR	SPW	SPL	SPR	Qualification
1	Hasegawa–Ageba (JPN)	3	3	0	6	6	0	MAX	84	46	1.826	Round of 16
2	Al-Shereiqi–Al-Housni (OMA)	3	2	1	5	4	2	2.000	111	82	1.354	Round of 16
3	Kim–Cha (KOR)	3	1	2	4	2	4	0.500	86	116	0.741	
4	Al-Sabaghah–Al-Ajmi (KUW)	3	0	3	3	0	6	0.000	47	84	0.560	

Source: AVC

Date		Score		Set 1	Set 2	Set 3
21 Sep	Hasegawa–Ageba (JPN)	2–0	Kim–Cha (KOR)	21–15	21–4	
21 Sep	Al-Shereiqi–Al-Housni (OMA)	2–0	Al-Sabaghah–Al-Ajmi (KUW)	21–8	21–7	
23 Sep	Kim–Cha (KOR)	2–0	Al-Sabaghah–Al-Ajmi (KUW)	21–15	21–17	
23 Sep	Hasegawa–Ageba (JPN)	2–0	Al-Shereiqi–Al-Housni (OMA)	21–9	21–18	
24 Sep	Al-Shereiqi–Al-Housni (OMA)	2–0	Kim–Cha (KOR)	21–16	21–9	
24 Sep	Hasegawa–Ageba (JPN)	2–0	Al-Sabaghah–Al-Ajmi (KUW)	Walkover		

==== Pool G ====
Pos	Team	Pld	W	L	Pts	SW	SL	SR	SPW	SPL	SPR	Qualification
1	Darkuncoro–Rachmawan (INA)	3	3	0	6	6	0	MAX	106	70	1.514	Round of 16
2	Sukarayotin–Yungtin (THA)	3	2	1	5	4	2	2.000	122	83	1.470	Round of 16
3	Sadat–Meyagul (AFG)	3	1	2	4	2	4	0.500	87	113	0.770	
4	Dashti–Bin Eid (KUW)	3	0	3	3	0	6	0.000	56	105	0.533	

Source: AVC

Date		Score		Set 1	Set 2	Set 3
20 Sep	Sukarayotin–Yungtin (THA)	2–0	Dashti–Bin Eid (KUW)	21–7	21–11	
20 Sep	Darkuncoro–Rachmawan (INA)	2–0	Sadat–Meyagul (AFG)	21–12	21–11	
22 Sep	Sadat–Meyagul (AFG)	2–0	Dashti–Bin Eid (KUW)	21–11	21–18	
22 Sep	Darkuncoro–Rachmawan (INA)	2–0	Sukarayotin–Yungtin (THA)	22–20	21–18	
23 Sep	Darkuncoro–Rachmawan (INA)	2–0	Dashti–Bin Eid (KUW)	21–9	Ret	
23 Sep	Sukarayotin–Yungtin (THA)	2–0	Sadat–Meyagul (AFG)	21–12	21–10	

==== Pool H ====
Pos	Team	Pld	W	L	Pts	SW	SL	SR	SPW	SPL	SPR	Qualification
1	Abdelrasoul–Khallouf (QAT)	3	3	0	6	6	0	MAX	126	77	1.636	Round of 16
2	Sukto–Sangkhachot (THA)	3	2	1	5	4	2	2.000	119	91	1.308	Round of 16
3	Abdul Hameed–Adil (MDV)	3	1	2	4	2	4	0.500	90	114	0.789	
4	Rustamzoda–Yorzoda (TJK)	3	0	3	3	0	6	0.000	73	126	0.579	

Source: AVC

Date		Score		Set 1	Set 2	Set 3
20 Sep	Abdelrasoul–Khallouf (QAT)	2–0	Abdul Hameed–Adil (MDV)	21–13	21–7	
20 Sep	Sukto–Sangkhachot (THA)	2–0	Rustamzoda–Yorzoda (TJK)	21–13	21–8	
22 Sep	Abdelrasoul–Khallouf (QAT)	2–0	Sukto–Sangkhachot (THA)	21–18	21–17	
22 Sep	Abdul Hameed–Adil (MDV)	2–0	Rustamzoda–Yorzoda (TJK)	21–15	21–15	
23 Sep	Abdelrasoul–Khallouf (QAT)	2–0	Rustamzoda–Yorzoda (TJK)	21–7	21–15	
23 Sep	Sukto–Sangkhachot (THA)	2–0	Abdul Hameed–Adil (MDV)	21–13	21–15	

=== Knockout round ===
Round of 16
Sidorenko–Dyachenko (KAZ)	21	21
Perera–Rathnapala (SRI)	12	11
Al-Shereiqi–Al-Housni (OMA)	13	18
Abdelrasoul–Khallouf (QAT)	21	21
Bao–Abuduhalikejiang (CHN)	21	21
Chui–Wong (HKG)	18	14
Murakami–Takahashi (JPN)	21	17	17
Kuleshov–Yakovlev (KAZ)	17	21	15
Chen–Li (CHN)	19	21	15
Sukto–Sangkhachot (THA)	21	12	12
Sukarayotin–Yungtin (THA)	18	19
Hasegawa–Ageba (JPN)	21	21
Darkuncoro–Rachmawan (INA)	21	21
Nordin–Mahadi (MAS)	11	13
Santosa–Fahriansyah (INA)	11	21	17
Santos–Pereira (QAT)	21	19	15

Quarterfinals
Sidorenko–Dyachenko (KAZ)	21	21
Abdelrasoul–Khallouf (QAT)	11	15
Bao–Abuduhalikejiang (CHN)	21	21
Murakami–Takahashi (JPN)	12	18
Chen–Li (CHN)	21	21
Hasegawa–Ageba (JPN)	18	12
Darkuncoro–Rachmawan (INA)	21	21
Santosa–Fahriansyah (INA)	7	17

Semifinals
Sidorenko–Dyachenko (KAZ)	21	19	15
Bao–Abuduhalikejiang (CHN)	16	21	11
Chen–Li (CHN)	15	22	15
Darkuncoro–Rachmawan (INA)	21	20	13

Gold medal match
Sidorenko–Dyachenko (KAZ)	21	21
Chen–Li (CHN)	15	10
Bronze medal match
Bao–Abuduhalikejiang (CHN)	21	21
Darkuncoro–Rachmawan (INA)	17	11

== Final standing ==
Rank	Team	Pld	W	L
1st place, gold medalist(s)	Alexey Sidorenko – Alexandr Dyachenko (KAZ)	6	6	0
2nd place, silver medalist(s)	Chen Cheng – Li Jian (CHN)	7	6	1
3rd place, bronze medalist(s)	Bao Jian – Abuduhalikejiang Mutailipu (CHN)	7	6	1
4	Koko Prasetyo Darkuncoro – Ade Candra Rachmawan (INA)	7	5	2
5	Dian Putra Santosa – Fahriansyah (INA)	5	3	2
5	Yoshiumi Hasegawa – Yuya Ageba (JPN)	5	4	1
5	Hitoshi Murakami – Takumi Takahashi (JPN)	5	3	2
5	Tamer Abdelrasoul – Abdelaziz Khallouf (QAT)	5	4	1
9	Chui Kam Lung – Wong Chun Wai (HKG)	4	2	2
9	Kuleshov Kuleshov – Dmitriy Yakovlev (KAZ)	4	3	1
9	Rafi Asruki Nordin – Razif Mahadi (MAS)	3	1	2
9	Haitham Al-Shereiqi – Ahmed Al-Housni (OMA)	4	2	2
9	Tiago Santos – Jefferson Pereira (QAT)	4	3	1
9	Mahesh Perera – Wasantha Rathnapala (SRI)	4	2	2
9	Chutipong Sukarayotin – Kittipat Yungtin (THA)	4	2	2
9	Prathip Sukto – Sittichai Sangkhachot (THA)	4	2	2
17	Habibullah Sadat – Edris Meyagul (AFG)	3	1	2
17	Sim Khlork – Lim Samat (CAM)	3	1	2
17	Kim Dae-kyoung – Cha Young-min (KOR)	3	1	2
17	Moon Jung-hyun – Lee Hee-yoon (KOR)	3	1	2
17	Raja Nazmi Saifuddin – Mohd Aizzat Zokri (MAS)	3	1	2
17	Adnan Abdul Hameed – Ibrahim Adil (MDV)	3	1	2
17	Faisal Al-Subhi – Mazin Al-Hashmi (OMA)	2	0	2
17	Asanka Pradeep Kumara – Pubudu Ekanayaka (SRI)	3	1	2
25	Zaker Ali Mohammad – Pardes Safi (AFG)	3	0	3
25	Horosit Biswas – Md Monir Hossain (BAN)	3	0	3
25	Jasem Al-Sabaghah – Faisal Al-Ajmi (KUW)	3	0	3
25	Abdulaziz Dashti – Yaqoub Bin Eid (KUW)	3	0	3
25	Shiunaz Abdul Wahid – Ahmed Anil Naseer (MDV)	3	0	3
25	Mukhsini Rustamzoda – Sharif Yorzoda (TJK)	3	0	3
25	Gaudêncio Xavier – Adriano Correia (TLS)	3	0	3
