= Chang Hui-min =

Taiwanese volleyball player (born 1979)

Personal information
- Nationality: Chinese Taipei
- Born: 8 October 1979 (age 47)
- Height: 174 cm (69 in)
- Weight: 58 kg (128 lb)
- Spike: 295 cm (116 in)
- Block: 285 cm (112 in)

Volleyball information
- Number: 11 (national team)

National team
| 2002-2007 | Chinese Taipei |

Chang Hui-min (born 8 October 1979) is a retired Taiwanese female volleyball player. She was part of the Chinese Taipei women's national volleyball team.

She participated in the 2007 FIVB Volleyball World Grand Prix. She competed at the 2002 Asian Games.
