= Kou Nai-han =

Taiwanese volleyball player (born 1982)

Personal information
- Full name: Kou Nai-han (顧乃涵)
- Born: 12 March 1982 (age 44); Taiwan
- Height: 1.73 m (5 ft 8 in)
- Weight: 60 kg (132 lb)
- Spike: 295 cm (116 in)
- Block: 280 cm (110 in)

Volleyball information
- Position: Attacker
- Current team: Taipei Physical Education College
- Number: 7 (national team)

National team
2006	Chinese Taipei
- Last updated: November 8, 2006

Kou Nai-han (Chinese: 顧乃涵; pinyin: Gù Nǎihán, born 12 March 1982) is a Taiwanese volleyball player who has played in 14 matches for the Chinese Taipei women's national volleyball team. She was part of the Chinese Taipei women's national volleyball team at the 2006 FIVB Volleyball Women's World Championship in Japan.

== Playing history ==
- National Taiwan Normal University
- Taipei Physical Education College

== Honours ==
- World University Games
  - Winner: 2005
  - Runner-up: 2003
