= Yoon Hye-suk =

South Korean volleyball player (born 1983)

Yoon Hye-Suk
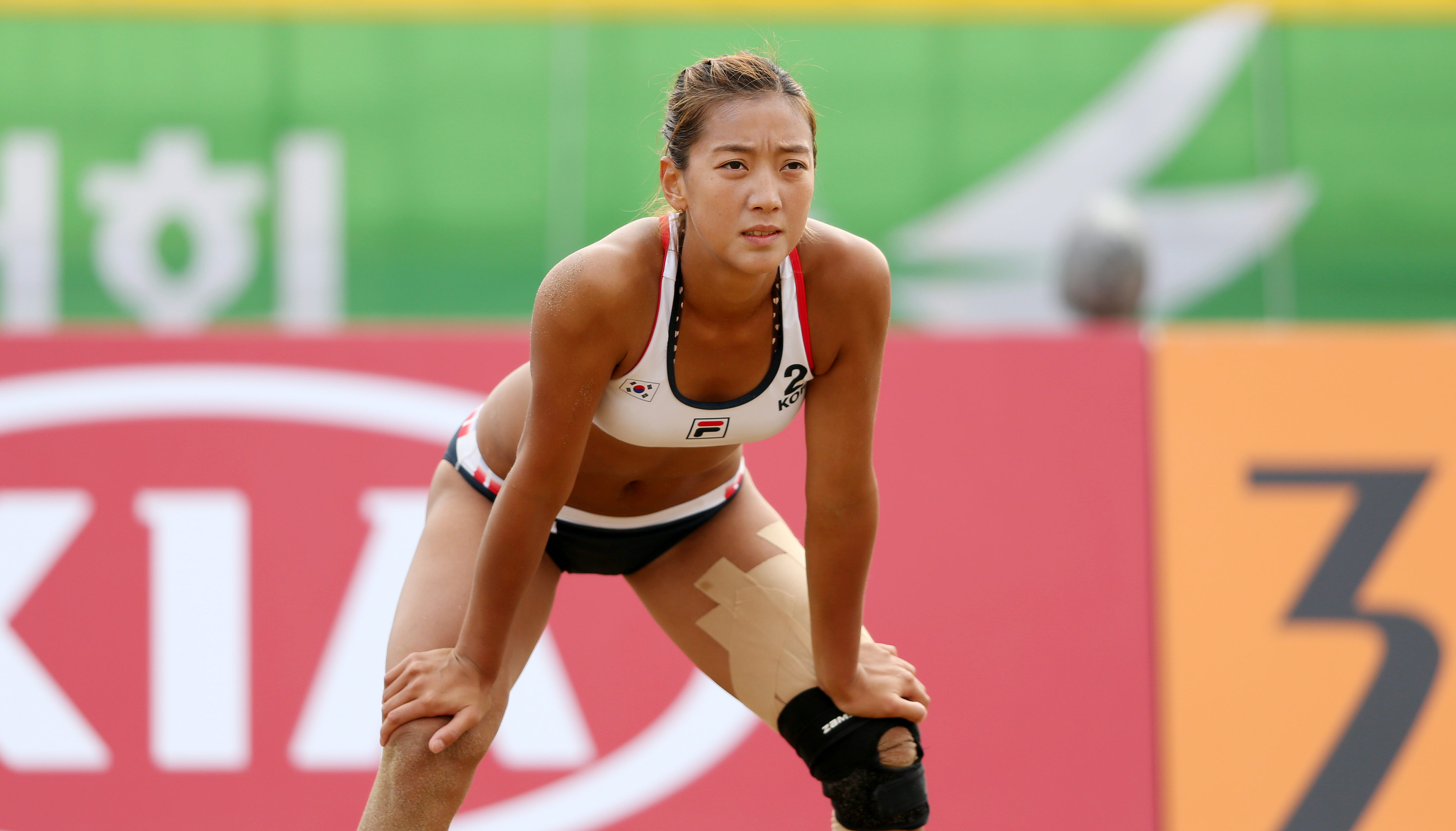
- Yoon Hye-Suk at the 2014 Asian Games.

Personal information
- Nationality: South Korean
- Born: 19 June 1983 (age 43)
- Height: 174 cm (5 ft 9 in)
- Weight: 60 kg (132 lb)
- Spike: 293 cm (115 in)
- Block: 283 cm (111 in)

Volleyball information
- Number: 2

Career
- Years: Team
- 2010: Hyundai

National team
- Years: Team
- 2010: South Korea

Yoon Hye-Suk (born 19 June 1983) is a retired South Korean female volleyball player. She was part of the South Korea women's national volleyball team.

She participated at the 2009 FIVB Women's World Grand Champions Cup, and at the 2010 FIVB Volleyball Women's World Championship. She played with Hyundai.

== Clubs ==
- Hyundai (2010)
