= Sri Lanka at the 2014 Asian Games =

- IOC code: SRI
- NOC: National Olympic Committee of Sri Lanka

in Incheon
- Medals Ranked 27th: Gold 1 Silver Bronze 1 Total 2

Asian Games appearances (overview)
- 1951; 1954; 1958; 1962; 1966; 1970; 1974; 1978; 1982; 1986; 1990; 1994; 1998; 2002; 2006; 2010; 2014; 2018; 2022; 2026

Sri Lanka participated in the 2014 Asian Games in Incheon, South Korea from 19 September to 4 October 2014. The country was only able to get a single Gold medal and a single bronze medal; both of which were in cricket. The men's cricket team defeated Afghanistan to win the gold medal. The team was led by Lahiru Thirimanne. The Sri Lankan women's team won the bronze medal by defeating China in the third place match. The team was captained by Chamari Atapattu and Coached by Jeevantha Kulatunga.
