= Jefferson Pereira =

Brazilian-born Qatari volleyball player (born 1989)

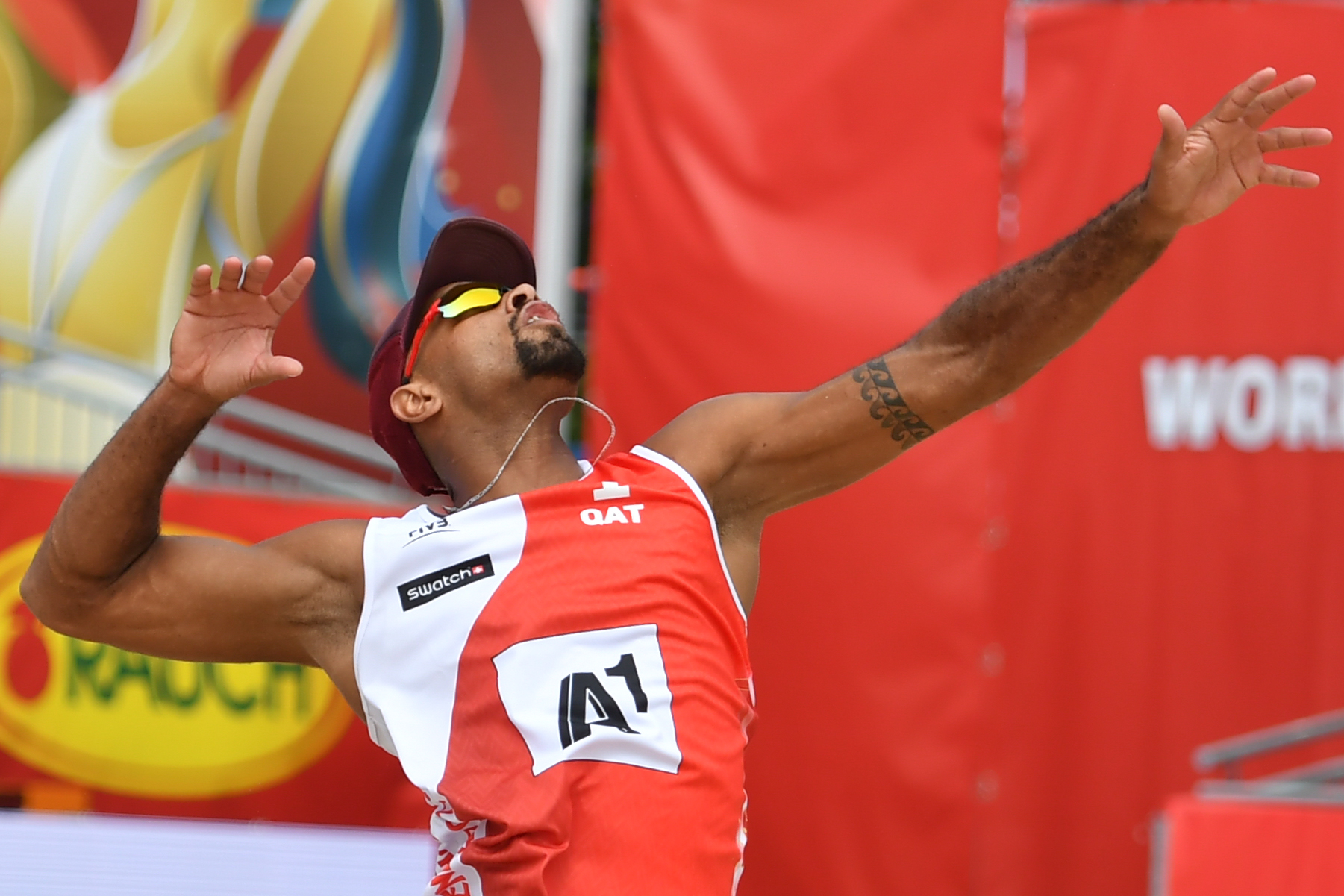

Personal information
- Full name: Jefferson Santos Pereira
- Nationality: Qatar
- Born: 8 June 1989 (age 37) Rio de Janeiro, Brazil
- Height: 1.80 m (5 ft 11 in)
- Weight: 86 kg (190 lb)

Jefferson Pereira (born June 8, 1989) is a Brazilian-born Qatari Olympic volleyball player.
