= Wang Fan (beach volleyball) =

Chinese beach volleyball player (born 1994)

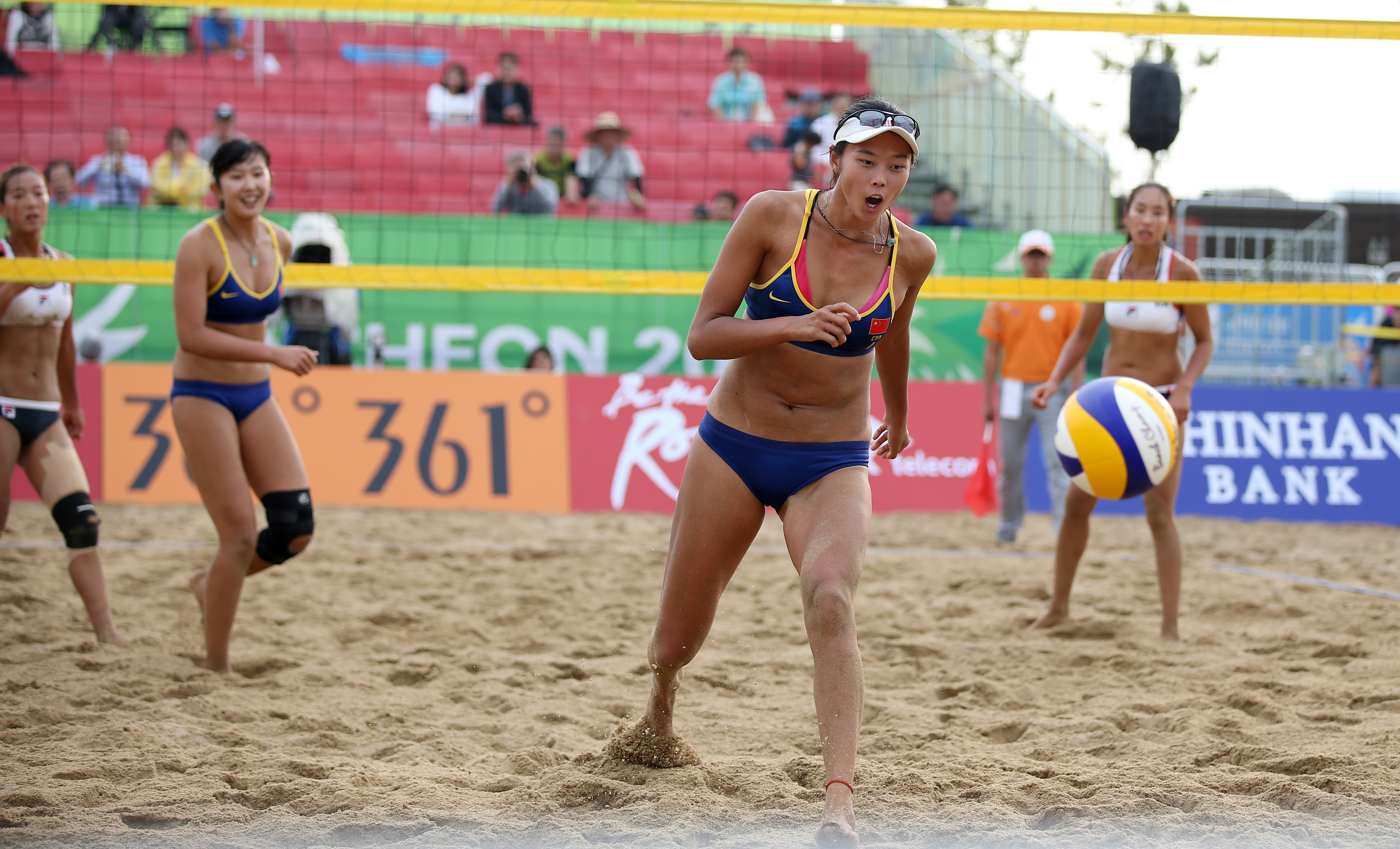

Personal information
- Nationality: China
- Born: 27 January 1994 (age 32) Shijiazhuang, China
- Height: 1.88 m (6 ft 2 in)
Honours
Women's beach volleyball
Representing China
Asian Games
Gold medal – first place	2018 Jakarta–Palembang	Women
Bronze medal – third place	2014 Incheon	Women
Bronze medal – third place	2022 Hangzhou	Women

Wang Fan (born 27 January 1994) is a Chinese beach volleyball player. She competed alongside Yue Yuan in the women's beach volleyball tournament at the 2016 Summer Olympics.
