= Tanarattha Udomchavee =

Thai beach volleyball player (born 1989)

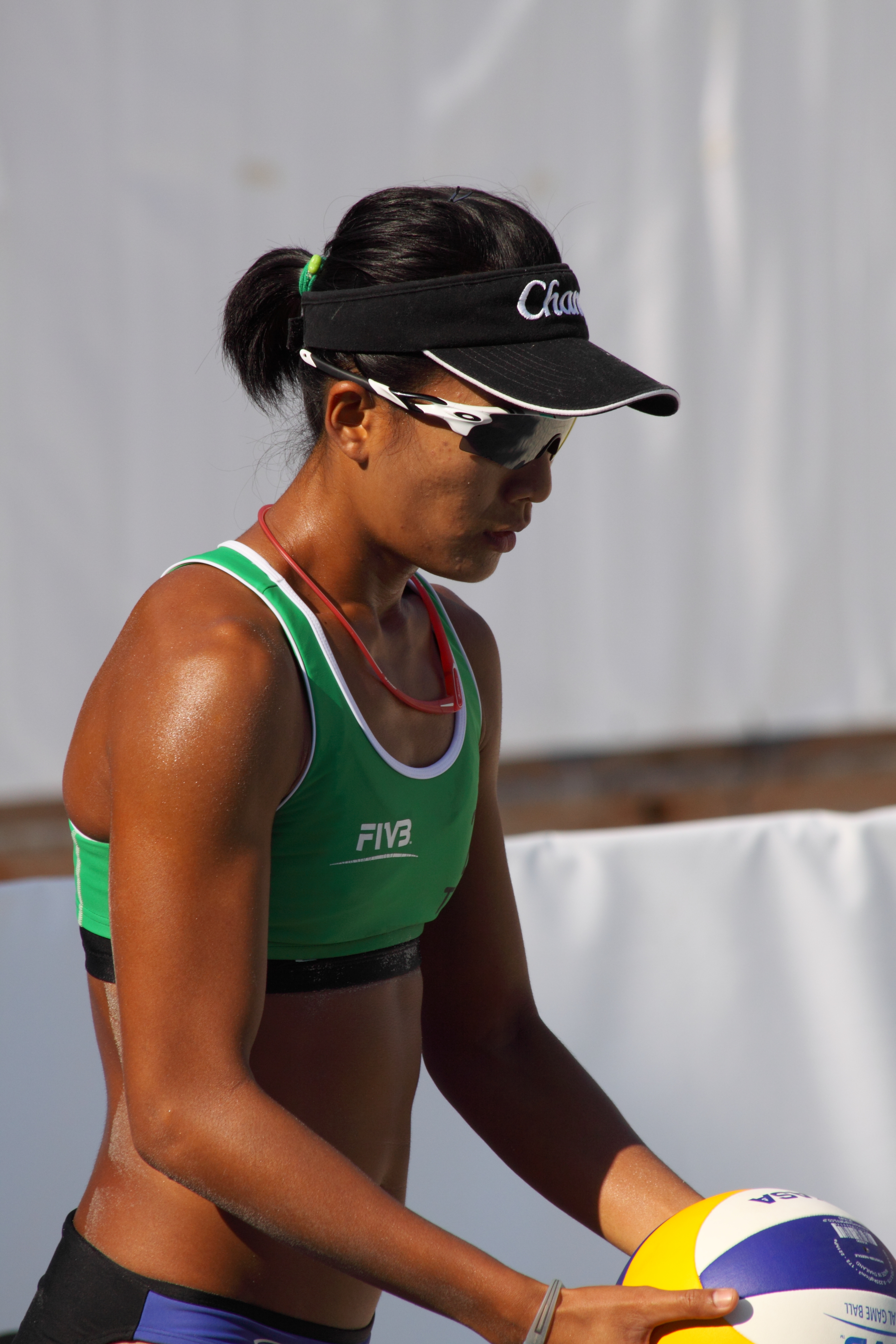
- Prague Open 2014

Medal record

Women's beach volleyball

Representing Thailand

Asian Games
| Silver medal – second place | 2014 Incheon | Women |

Southeast Asian Games
| Gold medal – first place | 2019 Philippines | Women's beach |

Tanarattha Udomchavee (Thai: ธนะรัศมิ์ฐา อุดมฉวี; RTGS: Thanarattha Udomchawi; born October 22, 1989) is a Thai beach volleyball player. She competed at the 2012 Asian Beach Games in Haiyang, China.
