= Varapatsorn Radarong =

Thai beach volleyball player (born 1988)

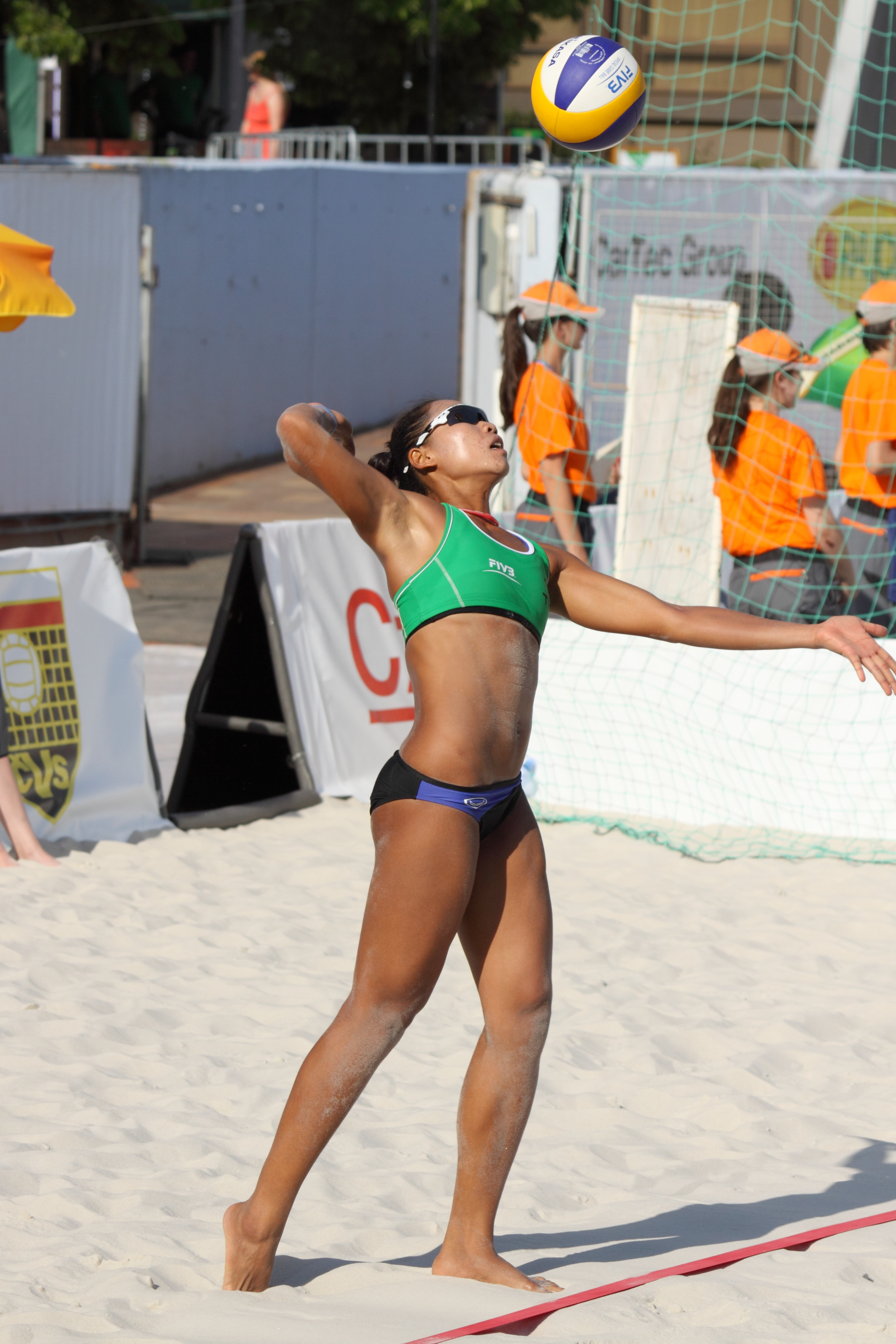
- Prague Open 2014

Personal information
- Born: 20 March 1988 (age 38)
Medal record
Women's beach volleyball
Representing Thailand
Asian Games
Silver medal – second place	2014 Incheon	Women's beach
Southeast Asian Games
Gold medal – first place	2011 Palembang	Women's beach
Gold medal – first place	2019 Philippines	Women's beach

Varapatsorn Radarong (Thai: วรภัสสร รดารงค์; born 20 March 1988) is a Thai beach volleyball player. She competed at the 2012 Asian Beach Games in Haiyang, China.

== Royal decoration ==
- 2023 – Commander (Third Class) of The Most Admirable Order of the Direkgunabhorn
