= Usa Tenpaksee =

Thai beach volleyball player

Personal information
- Born: 17 September 1984 (age 42)
Medal record
Women's beach volleyball
Representing Thailand
Asian Games
Bronze medal – third place	2010 Guangzhou	Women's beach
Southeast Asian Games
Silver medal – second place	2005 Philippines	Women's beach
Silver medal – second place	2007 Nakhon Ratchasima	Women's beach
Silver medal – second place	2009 Vientiane	Women's beach
Bronze medal – third place	2011 Palembang	Women's beach

Usa Tenpaksee (Thai: อุษา เต็นปักษี; born 17 September 1984) is a Thai beach volleyball player. She competed at the 2012 Asian Beach Games in Haiyang, China.
