= Alexandr Dyachenko =

Kazakhstani beach volleyball player

Medal record

Men's beach volleyball

Representing Kazakhstan

Asian Games
Gold medal – first place	2014 Incheon	Men

Alexandr Dyachenko (born 23 October 1980, Александр Александрович Дьяченко) is a Kazakhstani beach volleyball player. He competed at the 2012 Asian Beach Games in Haiyang, China.
