= Yue Yuan =

Chinese beach volleyball player (born 1987)

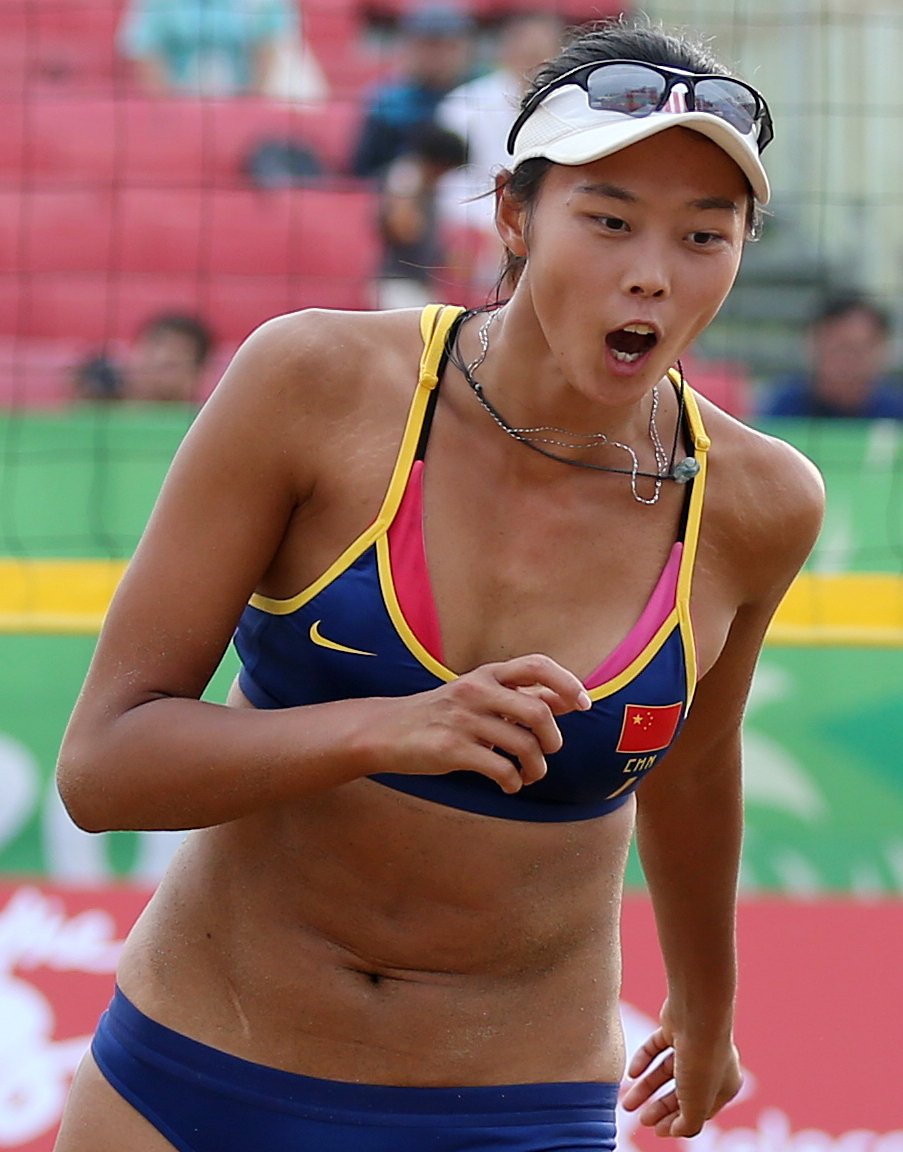
- Yue Yuan at the 2014 Asian Games

Personal information
- Nationality: China
- Born: 23 July 1987 (age 39) Weifang, China
- Height: 1.84 m (6 ft 0 in)
Honours
Women's beach volleyball
Representing China
Asian Games
Silver medal – second place	2010 Guangzhou	Women
Bronze medal – third place	2014 Incheon	Women

Yue Yuan (Chinese: 岳园; pinyin: Yuè Yuán; Mandarin pronunciation: [ɥê ɥɛ̌n]; born July 23, 1987) is a Chinese beach volleyball player. She competed alongside Wang Fan in the women's beach volleyball tournament in the 2016 Summer Olympics.
