= Sittichai Sangkhachot =

Thai beach volleyball player

Sittichai

Personal information
- Full name: Sittichai Sangkhachot
- Nickname: Yaw
- Born: 20 August 1987 (age 39); Bangkok, Thailand
- Height: 1.88 m (6 ft 2 in)

Sittichai Sangkhachot (Thai: สิทธิชัย สังขโชติ; born 20 August 1987 in Bangkok) is a Thai beach volleyball player. He competed at the 2012 Asian Beach Games in Haiyang, China
