= Prathip Sukto =

Thai beach volleyball player (born 1990)

Prathip

Personal information
- Full name: Prathip Sukto
- Nickname: Grap
- Born: 1 January 1990 (age 36); Thailand
- Hometown: Sisaket, Thailand
- Height: 1.87 m (6 ft 2 in)

Volleyball information
- Position: Outside hitter
- Number: 1

Prathip Sukto (Thai: ประทีป สุขโต; born January 1, 1990) is a Thai beach volleyball player. He is a member of the Thailand men's national beach volleyball team. He competed at the 2012 Asian Beach Games in Haiyang, China.

== Club indoor ==
- (Thailand) Cosmo Chiangrai VC (2015–2013, 2015–2016)
