= Tatyana Mashkova =

Kazakhstani beach volleyball player (born 1988)

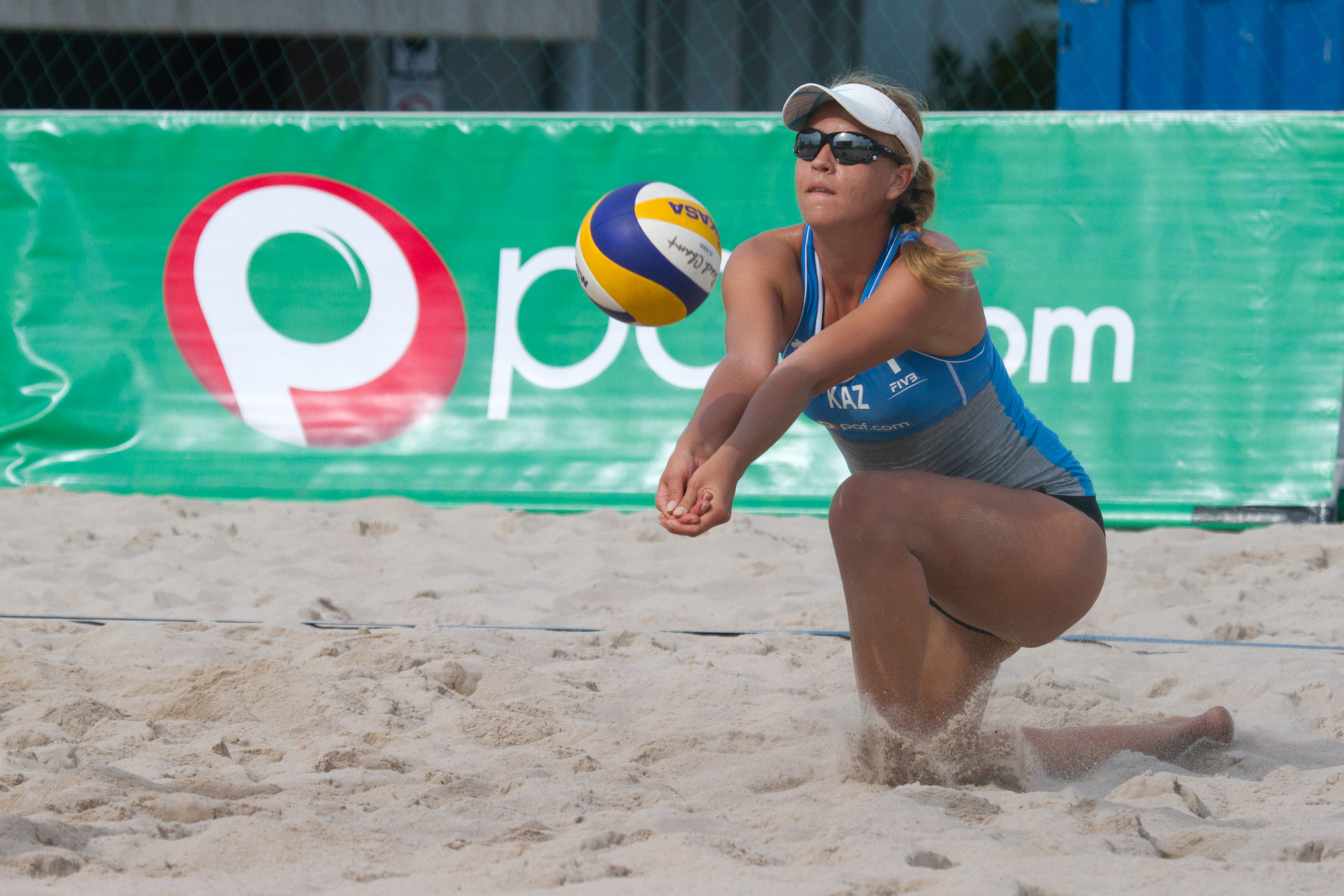
Tatyana Mashkova in 2012

Tatyana Mashkova (born March 6, 1988) is a Kazakhstani beach volleyball player. She competed at the 2012 Asian Beach Games in Haiyang, China.
