= Philippines men's national beach volleyball team =

National sports team

Philippines

Information
- Nickname: Alas Pilipinas (lit. 'Philippine Aces')
- Association: PNVF
- Coach: (Brazil) João Luciano Simao Barbosa

Colours
Home	Away	Third

Results

Asian Championship
- Appearances: 5 (First in 2007)
- Best result: 5th place (2001, 2021)
- Last updated on Unknown.

Philippines men's national beach volleyball team
Medal record

Volleyball World Beach Pro Tour
Silver medal – second place	2024 Nuvali Future	Buytrago/Varga

Southeast Asian Games
Bronze medal – third place	2019 Philippines	Team
Bronze medal – third place	2021 Quảng Ninh	Team
Bronze medal – third place	2023 Sihanoukville	Team

The Philippines men's national beach volleyball team is the national team of Philippines for beach volleyball. It is governed by Philippine National Volleyball Federation (PNVF) since 2021.

== Team image ==
=== Names ===
Nicknames
Nickname	In use
Alas Pilipinas	2024–present

The Philippine men's national beach volleyball team is known by their moniker, "Alas Pilipinas", with Alas meaning "Ace" in Filipino. The nickname is an official designation by the Philippine National Volleyball Federation in partnership with sponsor Cignal TV. Adopted on May 15, 2024, the moniker is shared with all the national volleyball teams of the Philippines, including beach volleyball.

== Rankings ==
The following pairs included are in the top 1,000 in the FIVB World Rankings.

As of December 16, 2024

Philippines' Men's Beach Volleyball World Rankings
Rank	Pair	Points	Tournaments played	Confederation
127	(Philippines) Buytrago/Varga	1304	6	AVC
245	(Philippines) Abdilla/Pareja	584	5	AVC
363	(Philippines) Tolentino/Rosales	360	2	AVC
396	(Philippines) Abdilla/Varga	324	2	AVC
423	(Philippines) Abdilla/Buytrago	300	1	AVC
423	(Philippines) Abdilla/Francisco	300	1	AVC
423	(Philippines) Francisco/Varga	300	1	AVC

== Current squad ==
Philippines - 2024 Volleyball World Beach Pro Tour (Nuvali Challenge)
Team	No.	Name	Date of birth	Height
A	1	James Buytrago	September 20, 1999 (age 27)	1.85 m (6 ft 1 in)
A	2	Rancel Varga	April 13, 2000 (age 26)	1.84 m (6 ft 1/2 in)
B	1	Alnakran Abdilla	April 22, 1991 (age 35)	1.93 m (6 ft 4 in)
B	2	Lerry John Francisco	October 28, 1998 (age 28)	
C	1	Edwin Tolentino	January 29, 1993 (age 33)	1.80 m (5 ft 11 in)
C	2	Ronniel Rosales	September 13, 1998 (age 28)	

The following persons were assigned by the Philippine National Volleyball Federation as part of the coaching staff.

Coaching Staff
Position	Name
Head coach	(Brazil) João Luciano Simao Barbosa
Assistant coach 1	(Brazil) Leonardo Gomes
Assistant coach 2	(Philippines) Rhovyl Verayo
S&C coach	(Philippines) John Paulo Agir
Team manager	(Philippines) Rosemarie Prochina

== Competitive record ==
The following are the rank of the Philippines men's beach volleyball team in past tournaments.

=== Volleyball World Beach Pro Tour ===
Year	Tier	Location	Representatives	Result
2022	Futures	(Philippines) Subic Bay		
2022	Futures	(Philippines) Subic Bay	Alnakran Abdilla; Jaron Requinton	5th place
2022	Futures	(Philippines) Subic Bay	Jude Garcia; Anthony Lemuel Arbasto Jr.	9th place
2022	Futures	(Philippines) Subic Bay	James Buytrago; Pol Gringo Salvador	9th place
2023	Challenge	(Philippines) Nuvali		
2023	Challenge	(Philippines) Nuvali	Alnakran Abdilla; Jaron Requinton	19th place
2023	Challenge	(Philippines) Nuvali	Anthony Lemuel Arbasto Jr. Alche Gupiteo	33rd place
2023	Challenge	(Philippines) Nuvali	James Buytrago; Rancel Varga	33rd place
2024	Futures	(Philippines) Nuvali	James Buytrago; Rancel Varga	Silver medal
2024	Futures	(Philippines) Nuvali	Alnakran Abdilla; Andre Joseph Pareja	13th place
2024	Futures	(Italy) Cervia	James Buytrago; Rancel Varga	9th place
2024	Futures	(Italy) Cervia	Alnakran Abdilla; Andre Joseph Pareja	17th place
2024	Futures	(Italy) Battipaglia	James Buytrago; Rancel Varga	13th place
2024	Futures	(Italy) Battipaglia	Alnakran Abdilla; Andre Joseph Pareja	21st place
2024	Futures	(Switzerland) Spiez	James Buytrago; Rancel Varga	9th place
2024	Futures	(Switzerland) Spiez	Alnakran Abdilla; Andre Joseph Pareja	13th place
2024	Futures	(China) Qingdao	Alnakran Abdilla; Rancel Varga	9th place
2024	Challenge	(Philippines) Nuvali	James Buytrago; Rancel Varga	19th place
2024	Challenge	(Philippines) Nuvali	Alnakran Abdilla; Lerry John Francisco	19th place
2024	Challenge	(Philippines) Nuvali	Edwin Tolentino; Ronniel Rosales	33rd place

=== FIVB Beach Volleyball World Tour ===
Year	Location	Representatives	Result
2018	(Philippines) Manila	Raphy Abanto; John Kevin Juban	unplaced
2018	(Philippines) Manila	Alnakran Abdilla; Edwin Tolentino	unplaced
2018	(Philippines) Manila	Jade Becaldo; Calvin Sarte	unplaced
2018	(Philippines) Manila	Kris Roy Guzman; Henry James Pecaña	unplaced
2019	(Philippines) Boracay		
2019	(Philippines) Boracay	Alnakran Abdilla; Jessie Lopez	unplaced
2019	(Philippines) Boracay	James Butraygo; Anthony Lemuel Arbasto Jr.	unplaced
2019	(Philippines) Boracay	Jade Becaldo; Mike Abria	unplaced

=== Asian Games ===
Year	Location	Representatives	Result
1998	(Thailand) Bangkok	Leonardo Toyco; Elmer Valdez	9th place
2002	(South Korea) Busan	did not participate	
2006	(Qatar) Doha	Parley Tupaz; Rhovyl Verayo	13th place
2010	(China) Guangdong	did not participate	
2014	(South Korea) Incheon	did not participate	
2018	(Indonesia) Palembang	did not participate	
2022	(China) Hangzhou	Jude Garcia; James Buytrago	9th place
2022	(China) Hangzhou	Jaron Requinton; Ranran Abdilla	17th place
2026	(Japan) Hekinan	Ranran Abdilla; Lerry John Francisco	17th place
2026	(Japan) Hekinan	James Buytrago; Ronniel Rosales	17th place

=== Asian Beach Games ===
Year	Location	Representatives	Result
2008	(Indonesia) Bali	Rhovyl Verayo; Jonrey Sasing	9th place
2008	(Indonesia) Bali	Benjaylo Labide; Angelo Espiritu	36th place
2010	(Oman) Muscat	did not participate	
2012	(China) Haiyang	did not participate	
2014	(Thailand) Phuket	Jade Becaldo; Loujie Tipgos	9th place
2014	(Thailand) Phuket	Edmar Bonono; Edward Ybañez	17th place
2016	(Vietnam) Da Nang	did not participate	

=== Asian Beach Volleyball Championship ===
Year	Location	Representatives	Result
2000	(China) Yangjiang	did not participate	
2001	(Philippines) Pasay	did not held	
2002	China	did not participate	
2004	China	did not participate	
2005	Thailand	did not participate	
2006	(Iran) Kish	did not participate	
2007	(Thailand) Songkhla	Parley Tupaz; Rhovyl Verayo	5th place
2008	India	did not participate	
2009	(China) Haikou	Gabriel Usman; Angelo Espiritu	17th place
2010	(China) Haikou	did not participate	
2011	(China) Haikou	did not participate	
2012	(China) Haikou	did not participate	
2013	(China) Wuhan	did not participate	
2014	(China) Jinjiang	did not participate	
2015	Hong Kong	did not held	
2016	(Australia) Sydney	did not participate	
2017	(Thailand) Songkhla	did not participate	
2018	(Thailand) Satun	did not participate	
2019	China	did not participate	
2020	(Thailand) Udon Thani	did not participate	
2021	(Thailand) Phuket	Jude Garcia; Anthony Lemuel Arbasto Jr.	5th place
2021	(Thailand) Phuket	Andre Joseph Pareja; Henry Pecaña	17th place
2022	(Iran) Bandar Abbas	did not participate	
2023	(China) Pingtan	Anthony Lemuel Arbasto Jr. Jaron Requinton	25th place
2023	(China) Pingtan	Jude Garcia; James Buytrago	25th place
2024	(Philippines) Sta. Rosa	Alnakran Abdilla; James Buytrago	19th place
2024	(Philippines) Sta. Rosa	Lerry John Francisco; Rancel Varga	19th place
2024	(Philippines) Sta. Rosa	Edwin Tolentino; Ronniel Rosales	29th place

=== AVC Beach Volleyball Continental Cup ===
Year	Location	Representatives	Result
2021	(Thailand) Nakhon Pathom	Jude Garcia; Anthony Lemuel Arbasto Jr.	Semifinal round
2021	(Thailand) Nakhon Pathom	Jaron Requinton; James Buytrago	Semifinal round

=== AVC Beach Tour ===
Year	Location	Representatives	Result
2022	(Thailand) Samila Open (Songkhla)	Jude Garcia; Anthony Lemuel Arbasto Jr.	17th place
2022	(Thailand) Samila Open (Songkhla)	Alnakran Abdilla; Jaron Requinton	17th place
2022	(Iran) Bandar Abbas Open	did not participate	
2023	(Thailand) Samila Open (Songkhla)	did not participate	
2023	(Taiwan) Penghu Open	Jude Garcia; James Buytrago	9th place
2023	(Taiwan) Penghu Open	Alnakran Abdilla; Jaron Requinton	9th place
2024	(Philippines) Nuvali Open	James Buytrago; Rancel Varga	9th place
2024	(Philippines) Nuvali Open	Alnakran Abdilla; Andre Joseph Pareja	9th place
2024	(Thailand) Samila Open (Songkhla)	did not participate	
2024	(Taiwan) Taoyuan Open	Alnakran Abdilla; Rancel Varga	9th place

=== South East Asian Games ===
Year	Location	Representatives	Result
2005	(Philippines) Bacolod	Rhovyl Verayo; Parley Tupaz	4th place
2005	(Philippines) Bacolod	Chad Mowrey; Justin Schonnor	5th place
2007	(Thailand) Nakhon Ratchasima	Rhovyl Verayo; Parley Tupaz	4th place
2007	(Thailand) Nakhon Ratchasima	Edward Balbuena; Mimi Dacurong	unplaced
2009	(Laos) Vientiane	Rhovyl Verayo; Jonrey Sasing	5th place
2011	(Indonesia) Palembang	did not participate	
2013	(Myanmar) Naypyidaw	did not held	
2015	Singapore	did not held	
2017	(Malaysia) Kuala Lumpur	did not held	
2019	(Philippines) Olongapo	Edmar Bonono; Jude Garcia	Bronze medal
2019	(Philippines) Olongapo	James Buytrago; Jaron Requinton	Bronze medal
2021	(Vietnam) Quảng Ninh	Jude Garcia; Anthony Lemuel Arbasto Jr.	Bronze medal
2021	(Vietnam) Quảng Ninh	Alnakran Abdilla; Jaron Requinton	Bronze medal
2023	(Cambodia) Sihanoukville	Alnakran Abdilla; Jaron Requinton	Bronze medal
2023	(Cambodia) Sihanoukville	James Buytrago; Jude Garcia	Bronze medal

=== South East Asian Beach Volleyball Championship ===
Year	Location	Representatives	Result
2017	Singapore	Jude Garcia; Anthony Lemuel Arbasto Jr.	5th place

== Youth teams ==
Philippines men's national under-21 beach volleyball team

Philippines (2021 FIVB Beach Volleyball U21 World Championship)

Philippines Under 21 - Official Line Up for 2021 FIVB Beach Volleyball U21 World Championship
No.	Name	Date of birth	Height
1	Jay Rack de la Noche	July 20, 2002 (age 24)	—N/a
2	Alexander Jhon Iraya	January 12, 2003 (age 23)	—N/a

Philippines men's national under-19 beach volleyball team

Philippines (2021 FIVB Beach Volleyball U19 World Championship)

Philippines Under 19 - Official Line Up for 2021 FIVB Beach Volleyball U19 World Championship
No.	Name	Date of birth	Height
1	Jay Rack de la Noche	July 20, 2002 (age 24)	—N/a
2	Alexander Jhon Iraya	January 12, 2003 (age 23)	—N/a

== Coaches ==
- (Philippines) Dante Lopez (2009)
- (Philippines) Rhovyl Verayo (2021–2022)
- (Brazil) João Luciano Simao Barbosa (2022–)

== See also ==
- Philippines women's national beach volleyball team
- Philippines women's national volleyball team
- Philippines men's national volleyball team
- Beach Volleyball Republic
- Volleyball in the Philippines
