= Philippines women's national beach volleyball team =

National sports team

Philippines

Information
- Nickname: Alas Pilipinas (lit. 'Philippine Aces')
- Association: PNVF
- Coach: (Brazil) João Luciano Simao Barbosa

Colours
Home	Away

Results

Asian Championship
- Appearances: 8 (First in 2000)
- Best result: 5th place (2001, 2009)
- Last updated on Unknown.

Philippines women's national beach volleyball team
Medal record

Volleyball World Beach Pro Tour
Gold medal – first place	2022 Subic Bay Future	Rondina/Gonzaga
Silver medal – second place	2022 Subic Bay Future	Rodriguez/Eslapor

Southeast Asian Games
Bronze medal – third place	2005 Bacolod	Illustre/Pascua
Bronze medal – third place	2019 Philippines	Team
Bronze medal – third place	2021 Quảng Ninh	Team

The Philippines women's national beach volleyball team is the national team of Philippines. It is governed by Philippine National Volleyball Federation (PNVF) since 2021.

== Team image ==
=== Names ===
Nicknames
Nickname	In use
Alas Pilipinas	2024–present

The Philippine women's national beach volleyball team is known by their moniker, "Alas Pilipinas", with Alas meaning "Ace" in Filipino. The nickname is an official designation by the Philippine National Volleyball Federation in partnership with sponsor Cignal TV. Adopted on May 15, 2024, the moniker is shared with all the national volleyball teams of the Philippines, including beach volleyball.

== Rankings ==
The following pairs included are in the top 1,000 pairs in the FIVB World Rankings.

As of December 16, 2024

Philippines' Women's Beach Volleyball World Rankings
Rank	Pair	Points	Tournaments played	Confederation
95	(Philippines) Eslapor/Orillaneda	1,576	9	AVC
199	(Philippines) Progella/Pagara	700	2	AVC
237	(Philippines) Polidario/Gaviola	580	4	AVC

== Current squad ==
Philippines - 2024 Volleyball World Beach Pro Tour (Nuvali Challenge)
Team	No.	Name	Date of birth	Height
A	1	Genesa Jane Eslapor	July 28, 1999 (age 27)	1.70 m (5 ft 7 in)
A	2	Mary Klymince Orillaneda	October 24, 1999 (age 27)	1.74 m (5 ft 8 1/2 in)
B	1	Alexa Polidario	January 2, 1998 (age 28)	1.70 m (5 ft 7 in)
B	2	Jenny Gaviola	October 8, 1998 (age 28)	1.75 m (5 ft 9 in)

The following persons were assigned by the Philippine National Volleyball Federation as part of the coaching staff.

Coaching Staff
Position	Name
Head coach	(Brazil) João Luciano Simao Barbosa
Assistant coach 1	(Brazil) Leonardo Gomes
Assistant coach 2	(Philippines) Romnick Rico
S&C coach	(Philippines) John Paulo Agir
Team manager	(Philippines) Rosemarie Prochina

== Competitive record ==
The following are the rank of the Philippines women's beach volleyball team in past tournaments.

=== Volleyball World Beach Pro Tour ===
Year	Tier	Location	Representatives	Result
2022	Futures	(Philippines) Subic Bay		
2022	Futures	(Philippines) Subic Bay	Sisi Rondina; Jovelyn Gonzaga	Gold medal
2022	Futures	(Philippines) Subic Bay	Floremel Rodriguez; Genesa Jane Eslapor	Silver medal
2022	Futures	(Philippines) Subic Bay	Grydelle Joanice Matibag; Khylem Harl Progella	13th place
2023	Challenge	(Philippines) Nuvali		
2023	Challenge	(Philippines) Nuvali	Floremel Rodriguez; Genesa Jane Eslapor	19th place
2023	Challenge	(Philippines) Nuvali	Khylem Harl Progella; Sofiah Shanine Pagara	33rd place
2024	Futures	(Philippines) Nuvali		
2024	Futures	(Philippines) Nuvali	Genesa Jane Eslapor; Mary Klymince Orillaneda	9th place
2024	Futures	(Philippines) Nuvali	Alexa Polidario; Jenny Gaviola	13th place
2024	Futures	(Italy) Cervia	Genesa Jane Eslapor; Mary Klymince Orillaneda	21st place
2024	Futures	(Italy) Battipaglia	Genesa Jane Eslapor; Mary Klymince Orillaneda	21st place
2024	Futures	(Switzerland) Spiez	Genesa Jane Eslapor; Mary Klymince Orillaneda	21st place
2024	Futures	(China) Qingdao	Genesa Jane Eslapor; Mary Klymince Orillaneda	9th place
2024	Futures	(China) Qingdao	Khylem Harl Progella; Sofiah Shanine Pagara	5th place
2024	Challenge	(Philippines) Nuvali		
2024	Challenge	(Philippines) Nuvali	Genesa Jane Eslapor; Mary Klymince Orillaneda	19th place
2024	Challenge	(Philippines) Nuvali	Alexa Polidario; Jenny Gaviola	33rd place

=== FIVB Beach Volleyball World Tour ===
Year	Location	Representatives	Result
2018	(Philippines) Manila	Sisi Rondina; Angeline Marie Gervacio	5th place
2018	(Philippines) Manila	Lourdilyn Catubag; Karen Quilario	13th place
2018	(Philippines) Manila	Maria Rosario "Charo" Soriano; Ma. Beatriz Dominique Tan	unplaced
2018	(Philippines) Manila	Jackielyn Estoquia; Dhannylaine Mae Demontaño	unplaced
2019	(Philippines) Boracay		
2019	(Philippines) Boracay	Sisi Rondina; Angeline Marie Gervacio	5th place
2019	(Philippines) Boracay	Ma. Beatriz Dominique Tan; Floremel Rodriguez	13th place
2019	(Philippines) Boracay	Jackielyn Estoquia; Dhannylaine Mae Demontaño	unplaced

=== Asian Games ===
Year	Location	Representatives	Result
1998	(Thailand) Bangkok	Helen Dosdos; Gina Miguel	9th place
2002	(South Korea) Busan	did not participate	
2006	(Qatar) Doha	Diane Pascua; Heidi Illustre	7th place
2010	(China) Guangdong	did not participate	
2014	(South Korea) Incheon	did not participate	
2018	(Indonesia) Palembang	did not participate	
2022	(China) Hangzhou	Floremel Rodriguez; Genesa Jane Eslapor	5th place
2022	(China) Hangzhou	Khylem Progella; Grydelle Joanice Matibag	9th place
2026	(Japan) Hekinan	Bernadeth Pons; Sisi Rondina	5th place
2026	(Japan) Hekinan	Khylem Progella; Sofiah Shanine Pagara	Bronze medal

=== Asian Beach Games ===
Year	Location	Representatives	Result
2008	(Indonesia) Bali	Michelle Carolino; Suzanne Roces	13th place
2008	(Indonesia) Bali	Nerissa Bautista; Jusabelle Brillo	13th place
2010	(Oman) Muscat	did not participate	
2012	(China) Haiyang	did not participate	
2014	(Thailand) Phuket	did not participate	
2016	(Vietnam) Da Nang	Roxanne Gorre; Regine Arocha	unplaced

=== Asian Beach Volleyball Championship ===
Year	Location	Representatives	Result
2000	(China) Yangjiang	Gina Miguel; Sheryl Tumayao	11th place
2000	(China) Yangjiang	Jennifer Buhawe; Rosalyn Labay	12th place
2001	(Philippines) Pasay	Helen Dosdos; Johanna Botor	5th place
2001	(Philippines) Pasay	Jennifer Buhawe; Sheryl Tumayao	5th place
2001	(Philippines) Pasay	Glenda Pintolo; Cecile Tabuena	5th place
2002	China	did not participate	
2004	China	did not participate	
2005	Thailand	did not participate	
2006	(Iran) Kish	did not held	
2007	(Thailand) Songkhla	Michelle Laborte; Michelle Carolino	9th place
2008	India	did not participate	
2009	(China) Haikou	Nerissa Bautista; Jusabelle Brillo	5th place
2010	(China) Haikou	Johanna Botor-Carpio; Nerissa Bautista	9th place
2011	(China) Haikou	did not participate	
2012	(China) Haikou	did not participate	
2013	(China) Wuhan	did not participate	
2014	(China) Jinjiang	did not participate	
2015	Hong Kong	did not participate	
2016	(Australia) Sydney	did not participate	
2017	(Thailand) Songkhla	did not participate	
2018	(Thailand) Satun	did not participate	
2019	China	did not participate	
2020	(Thailand) Udon Thani	did not participate	
2021	(Thailand) Phuket	Sisi Rondina; Bernadeth Pons	9th place
2021	(Thailand) Phuket	Floremel Rodriguez; Genesa Jane Eslapor	9th place
2022	(Thailand) Roi Et	Sisi Rondina; Bernadeth Pons	9th place
2022	(Thailand) Roi Et	Floremel Rodriguez; Genesa Jane Eslapor	9th place
2023	(China) Pingtan	Floremel Rodriguez; Genesa Jane Eslapor	17th place
2024	(Philippines) Sta. Rosa	Genesa Jane Eslapor; Mary Klymince Orillaneda	9th place
2024	(Philippines) Sta. Rosa	Khylem Harl Progella; Sofiah Shanine Pagara	9th place
2024	(Philippines) Sta. Rosa	Alexa Polidario; Jenny Gaviola	25th place

=== AVC Beach Volleyball Continental Cup ===
Year	Location	Representatives	Result
2021	(Thailand) Nakhon Pathom	Sisi Rondina; Bernadeth Pons	Semifinal round
2021	(Thailand) Nakhon Pathom	Floremel Rodriguez; Baby Love Barbon	Semifinal round

=== AVC Beach Tour ===
Year	Location	Representatives	Result
2022	(Thailand) Roi Et Open	Sisi Rondina; Bernadeth Pons	9th place
2022	(Thailand) Roi Et Open	Floremel Rodriguez; Genesa Jane Eslapor	unplaced
2022	(Thailand) Samila Open (Songkhla)	Sisi Rondina; Bernadeth Pons	5th place
2022	(Thailand) Samila Open (Songkhla)	Floremel Rodriguez; Genesa Jane Eslapor	5th place
2023	(Thailand) Samila Open (Songkhla)	did not participate	
2023	(Chinese Taipei) Penghu Open	Floremel Rodriguez; Genesa Jane Eslapor	9th place
2023	(Chinese Taipei) Penghu Open	Khylem Harl Progella; Sofiah Shanine Pagara	9th place
2024	(Philippines) Nuvali Open	Genesa Jane Eslapor; Mary Klymince Orillaneda	9th place
2024	(Philippines) Nuvali Open	Alexa Polidario; Jenny Gaviola	17th place
2024	(Thailand) Samila Open (Songkhla)	did not participate	
2024	(Chinese Taipei) Taoyuan Open	Genesa Jane Eslapor; Mary Klymince Orillaneda	5th place

=== South East Asian Games ===
Year	Location	Representatives	Result
2005	(Philippines) Bacolod	Heidi Illustre; Diane Pascua	Bronze medal
2005	(Philippines) Bacolod	Michelle Laborte; Cecille Tabuena	5th place
2007	(Thailand) Nakhon Ratchasima	Heidi Illustre; Diane Pascua	5th place
2007	(Thailand) Nakhon Ratchasima	Michelle Laborte; Michelle Carolino	5th place
2009	(Laos) Vientiane	Johanna Botor-Carpio; Michelle Carolino	5th place
2011	(Indonesia) Palembang	did not participate	
2013	(Myanmar) Naypyidaw	did not held	
2015	Singapore	did not held	
2017	(Malaysia) Kuala Lumpur	did not held	
2019	(Philippines) Olongapo	Sisi Rondina; Bernadeth Pons	Bronze medal
2019	(Philippines) Olongapo	Floremel Rodriguez; Angeline Marie Gervacio	Bronze medal
2021	(Vietnam) Quảng Ninh	Sisi Rondina; Bernadeth Pons	Bronze medal
2021	(Vietnam) Quảng Ninh	Jovelyn Gonzaga; Floremel Rodriguez	Bronze medal
2023	(Cambodia) Sihanoukville	Bernadeth Pons; Floremel Rodriguez	5th place
2023	(Cambodia) Sihanoukville	Sisi Rondina; Jovelyn Gonzaga	5th place

=== South East Asian Beach Volleyball Championship ===
Year	Location	Representatives	Result
2017	Singapore	Sisi Rondina; Bernadeth Pons	5th place
2017	Singapore	Patty Jane Orendain; Fiola Ceballos	5th place

== Coaches ==
- (Philippines) Dante Lopez (2009)
- (Philippines) Paul John Doloiras (2021–2022)
- (Brazil) João Luciano Simao Barbosa (2022–)

== See also ==
- Philippines men's national beach volleyball team
- Philippines women's national volleyball team
- Philippines men's national volleyball team
- Beach Volleyball Republic
- Volleyball in the Philippines
