= 2008 Asian Beach Volleyball Championships =

International beach volleyball competition

- Location: Hyderabad, India
- Dates: 3–6 April 2008

The 2008 Asian Beach Volleyball Championships (8th tournament) was a beach volleyball event, that was held from 3 to 6 April 2008 in Hyderabad, India.

== Medal summary ==
| Event | Gold | Silver | Bronze |
|---|---|---|---|
| Men | Indonesia; Andy Ardiyansah; Koko Prasetyo Darkuncoro | China; Gao Fangtian; Han Shengwei | Thailand; Borworn Yungtin; Sataporn Sawangrueang |
| Women | Thailand; Kamoltip Kulna; Yupa Phokongpoly | China; Miao Chenchen; Ji Linjun | Thailand; Jarunee Sannok; Usa Tenpaksee |

== Participating nations ==
=== Men ===
- China (2)
- Hong Kong (2)
- India (5)
- Indonesia (2)
- Iran (2)
- Kazakhstan (2)
- New Zealand (1)
- Sri Lanka (2)
- Thailand (2)

=== Women ===
- China (2)
- Hong Kong (2)
- India (4)
- Indonesia (1)
- Kazakhstan (2)
- Malaysia (1)
- New Zealand (2)
- Sri Lanka (1)
- Thailand (2)

== Men's tournament ==
=== Winners table ===
Round 1
| Date | | Score | | Set 1 | Set 2 | Set 3 |
|---|---|---|---|---|---|---|
| 03 Apr | Dhanujaya–Sashidar (India) | 0–2 | (India) Paul–Livingston | 15–21 | 18–21 | |
| 03 Apr | Yussupov–Tkachenko (Kazakhstan) | 2–0 | (Hong Kong) Kwok–Wong | 21–17 | 21–15 | |
| 03 Apr | Wong–Ng (Hong Kong) | 2–0 | (India) Sunil–Yusuf | 21–16 | 22–20 | |
| 03 Apr | Mahesh–Dinesh (Sri Lanka) | 2–0 | (India) Ramamurthy–Nixon | 21–13 | 21–12 | |

Round 2
| Date | | Score | | Set 1 | Set 2 | Set 3 |
|---|---|---|---|---|---|---|
| 03 Apr | Andy–Koko (Indonesia) | 2–0 | (India) Paul–Livingston | 21–16 | 21–18 | |
| 03 Apr | Naeini–Raoufi (Iran) | 2–0 | (Kazakhstan) Babichev–Kuleshov | 24–22 | 21–16 | |
| 03 Apr | Gao–Han (China) | 2–0 | (Sri Lanka) Dammika–Pubudu | 21–14 | 21–14 | |
| 03 Apr | Yussupov–Tkachenko (Kazakhstan) | 0–2 | (Thailand) Borworn–Sataporn | 16–21 | 8–21 | |
| 03 Apr | John–Mohan (India) | 2–0 | (Hong Kong) Wong–Ng | 21–10 | 21–14 | |
| 03 Apr | Li–Gao (China) | 0–2 | (Iran) Farrokhi–Houshmand | 16–21 | 18–21 | |
| 03 Apr | Lindsay–Watson (New Zealand) | 2–1 | (Thailand) Sittichai–Damrongrit | 21–15 | 14–21 | 15–10 |
| 03 Apr | Mahesh–Dinesh (Sri Lanka) | 2–1 | (Indonesia) Suratna–Dian Putra | 21–14 | 17–21 | 15–13 |

Round 3
| Date | | Score | | Set 1 | Set 2 | Set 3 |
|---|---|---|---|---|---|---|
| 04 Apr | Andy–Koko (Indonesia) | 2–0 | (Iran) Naeini–Raoufi | 21–16 | 21–12 | |
| 04 Apr | Gao–Han (China) | 2–1 | (Thailand) Borworn–Sataporn | 21–15 | 11–21 | 15–9 |
| 04 Apr | John–Mohan (India) | 0–2 | (Iran) Farrokhi–Houshmand | 12–21 | 13–21 | |
| 04 Apr | Lindsay–Watson (New Zealand) | 2–1 | (Sri Lanka) Mahesh–Dinesh | 23–25 | 21–17 | 15–12 |

Round 4
| Date | | Score | | Set 1 | Set 2 | Set 3 |
|---|---|---|---|---|---|---|
| 04 Apr | Andy–Koko (Indonesia) | 2–1 | (China) Gao–Han | 18–21 | 22–20 | 15–7 |
| 04 Apr | Farrokhi–Houshmand (Iran) | 2–0 | (New Zealand) Lindsay–Watson | 21–9 | 21–10 | |

=== Losers table ===
Rank 17
| Date | | Score | | Set 1 | Set 2 | Set 3 |
|---|---|---|---|---|---|---|
| 03 Apr | Ramamurthy–Nixon (India) | 2–1 | (India) Paul–Livingston | 18–21 | 21–19 | 15–9 |
| 03 Apr | Yussupov–Tkachenko (Kazakhstan) | 0–2 | (India) Sunil–Yusuf | 12–21 | 17–21 | |
| 03 Apr | Kwok–Wong (Hong Kong) | 0–2 | (Hong Kong) Wong–Ng | 14–21 | 16–21 | |
| 03 Apr | Sittichai–Damrongrit (Thailand) | 2–0 | (India) Dhanujaya–Sashidar | 21–16 | 21–15 | |

Rank 13
| Date | | Score | | Set 1 | Set 2 | Set 3 |
|---|---|---|---|---|---|---|
| 04 Apr | Babichev–Kuleshov (Kazakhstan) | 2–0 | (India) Ramamurthy–Nixon | 21–17 | 21–15 | |
| 04 Apr | Sunil–Yusuf (India) | 0–2 | (Sri Lanka) Dammika–Pubudu | 10–21 | 15–21 | |
| 04 Apr | Li–Gao (China) | 2–0 | (Hong Kong) Wong–Ng | 21–14 | 21–18 | |
| 04 Apr | Sittichai–Damrongrit (Thailand) | 0–2 | (Indonesia) Suratna–Dian Putra | 9–21 | 17–21 | |

Rank 9
| Date | | Score | | Set 1 | Set 2 | Set 3 |
|---|---|---|---|---|---|---|
| 04 Apr | Borworn–Sataporn (Thailand) | 2–1 | (Indonesia) Suratna–Dian Putra | 21–16 | 19–21 | 15–11 |
| 04 Apr | Li–Gao (China) | 0–2 | (Iran) Naeini–Raoufi | 22–24 | 17–21 | |
| 04 Apr | Mahesh–Dinesh (Sri Lanka) | 2–0 | (Sri Lanka) Dammika–Pubudu | 21–15 | 21–18 | |
| 04 Apr | Babichev–Kuleshov (Kazakhstan) | 2–0 | (India) John–Mohan | 21–10 | 21–13 | |

Rank 7/8
| Date | | Score | | Set 1 | Set 2 | Set 3 |
|---|---|---|---|---|---|---|
| 04 Apr | Borworn–Sataporn (Thailand) | 2–1 | (Iran) Naeini–Raoufi | 16–21 | 23–21 | 15–12 |
| 04 Apr | Dammika–Pubudu (Sri Lanka) | 0–2 | (Kazakhstan) Babichev–Kuleshov | 16–21 | 16–21 | |

Rank 5/6
| Date | | Score | | Set 1 | Set 2 | Set 3 |
|---|---|---|---|---|---|---|
| 05 Apr | Lindsay–Watson (New Zealand) | 0–2 | (Thailand) Borworn–Sataporn | 17–21 | 16–21 | |
| 05 Apr | Babichev–Kuleshov (Kazakhstan) | 0–2 | (China) Gao–Han | 16–21 | 16–21 | |

=== 7th place ===
| Date | | Score | | Set 1 | Set 2 | Set 3 |
|---|---|---|---|---|---|---|
| 06 Apr | Naeini–Raoufi (Iran) | 2–0 | (Sri Lanka) Dammika–Pubudu | 21–19 | 21–7 | |

=== 5th place ===
| Date | | Score | | Set 1 | Set 2 | Set 3 |
|---|---|---|---|---|---|---|
| 06 Apr | Lindsay–Watson (New Zealand) | 0–2 | (Kazakhstan) Babichev–Kuleshov | 19–21 | 18–21 | |

=== Medal round ===
Semifinals; 5 April
(Indonesia) Andy–Koko | 12 | 21 | 15
(Thailand) Borworn–Sataporn | 21 | 19 | 7
(Iran) Farrokhi–Houshmand | 20 | 17
(China) Gao–Han | 22 | 21

Final; 6 April
(Indonesia) Andy–Koko | 21 | 19 | 22
(China) Gao–Han | 15 | 21 | 20
3rd place
(Thailand) Borworn–Sataporn | 18 | 23 | 17
(Iran) Farrokhi–Houshmand | 21 | 21 | 15

== Women's tournament ==
=== Winners table ===
Round 1
| Date | | Score | | Set 1 | Set 2 | Set 3 |
|---|---|---|---|---|---|---|
| 03 Apr | Pilipenko–Samalikova (Kazakhstan) | 0–2 | (Hong Kong) Tse–Kong | 8–21 | 5–21 | |
| 03 Apr | Anitha–Rajani (India) | 0–2 | (Hong Kong) Cheng–Chan | 22–24 | 18–21 | |

Round 2
| Date | | Score | | Set 1 | Set 2 | Set 3 |
|---|---|---|---|---|---|---|
| 03 Apr | Kamoltip–Yupa (Thailand) | 2–0 | (Hong Kong) Tse–Kong | 21–9 | 21–19 | |
| 03 Apr | Issayeva–Kokhan (Kazakhstan) | 2–0 | (India) Pavitra–Swetha | 22–20 | 21–8 | |
| 03 Apr | Miao–Ji (China) | | Bye | | | |
| 03 Apr | Thakshila–Sujeewa (Sri Lanka) | 1–2 | (Malaysia) Iswari–Beh | 21–13 | 9–21 | 7–15 |
| 03 Apr | Kanaka–Srilatha (India) | 2–0 | (India) Nathiya–Christy Roselin | 21–17 | 21–15 | |
| 03 Apr | Timy–Ayu Cahyaning (Indonesia) | 1–2 | (New Zealand) Scarlett–Blundell | 21–18 | 14–21 | 12–15 |
| 03 Apr | Yue–Zhang (China) | 2–1 | (New Zealand) Preston–Brown | 19–21 | 21–17 | 15–5 |
| 03 Apr | Cheng–Chan (Hong Kong) | 0–2 | (Thailand) Jarunee–Usa | 12–21 | 11–21 | |

Round 3
| Date | | Score | | Set 1 | Set 2 | Set 3 |
|---|---|---|---|---|---|---|
| 04 Apr | Kamoltip–Yupa (Thailand) | 2–0 | (Kazakhstan) Issayeva–Kokhan | 21–11 | 21–9 | |
| 04 Apr | Miao–Ji (China) | 2–0 | (Malaysia) Iswari–Beh | 21–16 | 21–15 | |
| 04 Apr | Nathiya–Christy Roselin (India) | 0–2 | (New Zealand) Scarlett–Blundell | 11–21 | 12–21 | |
| 04 Apr | Yue–Zhang (China) | 1–2 | (Thailand) Jarunee–Usa | 21–19 | 18–21 | 16–18 |

Round 4
| Date | | Score | | Set 1 | Set 2 | Set 3 |
|---|---|---|---|---|---|---|
| 04 Apr | Kamoltip–Yupa (Thailand) | 1–2 | (China) Miao–Ji | 12–21 | 21–19 | 10–15 |
| 04 Apr | Scarlett–Blundell (New Zealand) | 2–0 | (Thailand) Jarunee–Usa | 21–16 | 21–17 | |

=== Losers table ===
Rank 17
| Date | | Score | | Set 1 | Set 2 | Set 3 |
|---|---|---|---|---|---|---|
| 03 Apr | Anitha–Rajani (India) | 0–2 | (Hong Kong) Tse–Kong | 11–21 | 7–21 | |
| 03 Apr | Cheng–Chan (Hong Kong) | 2–1 | (Kazakhstan) Pilipenko–Samalikova | 21–14 | 20–22 | 15–6 |
Play-off
| 04 Apr | Anitha–Rajani (India) | 1–2 | (Kazakhstan) Pilipenko–Samalikova | 17–21 | 21–19 | 13–15 |

Rank 13
| Date | | Score | | Set 1 | Set 2 | Set 3 |
|---|---|---|---|---|---|---|
| 04 Apr | Pavitra–Swetha (India) | 0–2 | (Hong Kong) Tse–Kong | 16–21 | 5–21 | |
| 04 Apr | Thakshila–Sujeewa (Sri Lanka) | 2–0 | (Kazakhstan) Pilipenko–Samalikova | 21–11 | 21–6 | |
| 04 Apr | Timy–Ayu Cahyaning (Indonesia) | 2–0 | (India) Nathiya–Christy Roselin | 21–11 | 21–6 | |
| 04 Apr | Cheng–Chan (Hong Kong) | 0–2 | (New Zealand) Preston–Brown | 13–21 | 13–21 | |

Rank 9
| Date | | Score | | Set 1 | Set 2 | Set 3 |
|---|---|---|---|---|---|---|
| 04 Apr | Iswari–Beh (Malaysia) | 2–0 | (New Zealand) Preston–Brown | 21–17 | 21–8 | |
| 04 Apr | Timy–Ayu Cahyaning (Indonesia) | 2–1 | (Kazakhstan) Issayeva–Kokhan | 16–21 | 21–9 | 25–23 |
| 04 Apr | Yue–Zhang (China) | 2–0 | (Sri Lanka) Thakshila–Sujeewa | 21–14 | 21–11 | |
| 04 Apr | Tse–Kong (Hong Kong) | 2–0 | (India) Nathiya–Christy Roselin | 21–9 | 21–13 | |

Rank 7/8
| Date | | Score | | Set 1 | Set 2 | Set 3 |
|---|---|---|---|---|---|---|
| 04 Apr | Iswari–Beh (Malaysia) | 2–0 | (Indonesia) Timy–Ayu Cahyaning | 21–13 | 21–0 | |
| 04 Apr | Yue–Zhang (China) | 2–0 | (Hong Kong) Tse–Kong | 21–12 | 21–16 | |

Rank 5/6
| Date | | Score | | Set 1 | Set 2 | Set 3 |
|---|---|---|---|---|---|---|
| 05 Apr | Kamoltip–Yupa (Thailand) | 2–0 | (Malaysia) Iswari–Beh | 21–16 | 21–9 | |
| 05 Apr | Yue–Zhang (China) | 0–2 | (Thailand) Jarunee–Usa | 16–21 | 22–24 | |

=== 7th place ===
| Date | | Score | | Set 1 | Set 2 | Set 3 |
|---|---|---|---|---|---|---|
| 06 Apr | Timy–Ayu Cahyaning (Indonesia) | 2–0 | (Hong Kong) Tse–Kong | Walkover | | |

=== 5th place ===
| Date | | Score | | Set 1 | Set 2 | Set 3 |
|---|---|---|---|---|---|---|
| 06 Apr | Iswari–Beh (Malaysia) | 0–2 | (China) Yue–Zhang | 17–21 | 19–21 | |

=== Medal round ===
Semifinals; 5 April
(China) Miao–Ji | 24 | 21
(Thailand) Jarunee–Usa | 22 | 14
(New Zealand) Scarlett–Blundell | 17 | 14
(Thailand) Kamoltip–Yupa | 21 | 21

Final; 6 April
(China) Miao–Ji | 19 | 20
(Thailand) Kamoltip–Yupa | 21 | 22
3rd place
(Thailand) Jarunee–Usa | 21 | 21
(New Zealand) Scarlett–Blundell | 13 | 19
