= Volleyball at the SEA Games =

Volleyball has been a regular SEA Games sport since the 1977 edition, with an exception in 1999 event.

== Indoor Volleyball ==
=== Men's tournaments ===
Year	Host	Gold medal match			Bronze medal match			Teams
Year	Host	Gold Medalists	Score	Silver Medalists	Bronze Medalists	Score	4th place	Teams
1977; Details	(Malaysia); Kuala Lumpur	Burma	—N/a	Philippines	Thailand	—N/a	—N/a	?
1979; Details	(Indonesia); Jakarta	Burma	—N/a	Indonesia	Philippines	—N/a	—N/a	?
1981; Details	(Philippines); Manila	Indonesia	—N/a	Burma	Philippines	—N/a	—N/a	?
1983; Details	Singapore	Burma	3–0	Indonesia	Philippines	3–0	Singapore	8
1985; Details	(Thailand); Bangkok	Thailand	—N/a	Indonesia	Singapore	—N/a	—N/a	?
1987; Details	(Indonesia); Jakarta	Indonesia	—N/a	Burma	Thailand	—N/a	—N/a	?
1989; Details	(Malaysia); Kuala Lumpur	Indonesia	3–2	Myanmar	Thailand	—N/a	—N/a	?
1991; Details	(Philippines); Manila	Indonesia	—N/a	Thailand	Philippines	—N/a	—N/a	?
1993; Details	Singapore	Indonesia	—N/a	Thailand	Singapore	—N/a	—N/a	?
1995; Details	(Thailand); Chiang Mai	Thailand	3–0	Myanmar	Indonesia	—N/a	—N/a	?
1997; Details	(Indonesia); Jakarta	Indonesia	—N/a	Thailand	Philippines	—N/a	—N/a	?
2001; Details	(Malaysia); Kuala Lumpur	Thailand	3–0	Malaysia	Myanmar	3–0	Indonesia	6
2003; Details	(Vietnam); Ninh Bình	Indonesia	3–0	Thailand	Myanmar	3–2	Vietnam	7
2005; Details	(Philippines); Bacolod	Thailand	3–1	Indonesia	Vietnam	No Bronze medal match	Myanmar	5
2007; Details	(Thailand); Nakhon Ratchasima	Indonesia	3–0	Vietnam	Thailand	3–0	Myanmar	5
2009; Details	(Laos); Vientiane	Indonesia	3–2	Thailand	Myanmar	3–0	Vietnam	6
2011; Details	(Indonesia); Palembang	Thailand	3–0	Indonesia	Vietnam	No Bronze medal match	Myanmar	6
2013; Details	(Myanmar); Naypyidaw	Thailand	3–0	Indonesia	Vietnam	3–0	Myanmar	7
2015; Details	Singapore	Thailand	3–0	Vietnam	Indonesia and Myanmar; Shared Bronze Medal			7
2017; Details	(Malaysia); Kuala Lumpur	Thailand	3–1	Indonesia	Vietnam	3–0	Myanmar	8
2019; Details	(Philippines); Pasig	Indonesia	3–0	Philippines	Thailand	3–0	Myanmar	7
2021; Details	(Vietnam); Quảng Ninh	Indonesia	3–0	Vietnam	Cambodia	3–2	Thailand	7
2023; Details	(Cambodia); Phnom Penh	Indonesia	3–0	Cambodia	Vietnam	3–0	Thailand	8
2025; Details	(Thailand); Bangkok	Thailand	3–2	Indonesia	Philippines	3–2	Vietnam	7

==== Medal summary ====
Below is the total medal count of SEA Games Men's Volleyball from 1977 to the present.

Rank	Nation	Gold	Silver	Bronze	Total
1	Indonesia	12	8	2	22
2	Thailand	9	5	5	19
3	Myanmar	3	4	4	11
4	Vietnam	0	3	5	8
5	Philippines	0	2	6	8
6	Cambodia	0	1	1	2
7	Malaysia	0	1	0	1
8	Singapore	0	0	2	2
Totals (8 entries)		24	24	25	73

=== Women's tournaments ===
Year	Host	Gold medal match			Bronze medal match			Teams
Year	Host	Gold Medalists	Score	Silver Medalists	Bronze Medalists	Score	4th place	Teams
1977; Details	(Malaysia); Kuala Lumpur	Philippines	—N/a	Indonesia	Thailand	—N/a	—N/a	?
1979; Details	(Indonesia); Jakarta	Philippines	—N/a	Indonesia	Thailand	—N/a	—N/a	?
1981; Details	(Philippines); Manila	Philippines	—N/a	Indonesia	Singapore	—N/a	—N/a	?
1983; Details	Singapore	Indonesia	3–2	Philippines	Malaysia	No Bronze medal match	Thailand	6
1985; Details	(Thailand); Bangkok	Philippines	—N/a	Thailand	Indonesia	—N/a	—N/a	?
1987; Details	(Indonesia); Jakarta	Philippines	—N/a	Indonesia	Thailand	—N/a	—N/a	?
1989; Details	(Malaysia); Kuala Lumpur	Thailand	—N/a	Indonesia	Myanmar	—N/a	Philippines	?
1991; Details	(Philippines); Manila	Thailand	—N/a	Indonesia	Philippines	—N/a	—N/a	?
1993; Details	Singapore	Philippines	—N/a	Thailand	Indonesia	—N/a	—N/a	?
1995; Details	(Thailand); Chiang Mai	Thailand	3–0	Philippines	Myanmar	—N/a	Indonesia	?
1997; Details	(Indonesia); Jakarta	Thailand	—N/a	Philippines	Vietnam	—N/a	Indonesia	?
2001; Details	(Malaysia); Kuala Lumpur	Thailand	3–0	Vietnam	Philippines	3–1	Indonesia	7
2003; Details	(Vietnam); Ninh Bình	Thailand	3–0	Vietnam	Philippines	3–2	Indonesia	5
2005; Details	(Philippines); Bacolod	Thailand	3–0	Vietnam	Philippines	No Bronze medal match	Indonesia	5
2007; Details	(Thailand); Nakhon Ratchasima	Thailand	3–0	Vietnam	Indonesia	3–0	Laos	4
2009; Details	(Laos); Vientiane	Thailand	3–1	Vietnam	Indonesia	3–0	Laos	4
2011; Details	(Indonesia); Palembang	Thailand	3–1	Vietnam	Indonesia	No Bronze medal match	Myanmar	5
2013; Details	(Myanmar); Naypyidaw	Thailand	3–0	Vietnam	Indonesia	3–0	Myanmar	5
2015; Details	Singapore	Thailand	3–0	Vietnam	Indonesia and Singapore; Shared Bronze Medal			7
2017; Details	(Malaysia); Kuala Lumpur	Thailand	3–0	Indonesia	Vietnam	3–1	Philippines	6
2019; Details	(Philippines); Pasig	Thailand	3–0	Vietnam	Indonesia	3–2	Philippines	4
2021; Details	(Vietnam); Quảng Ninh	Thailand	3–0	Vietnam	Indonesia	3–1	Philippines	5
2023; Details	(Cambodia); Phnom Penh	Thailand	3–1	Vietnam	Indonesia	3–1	Philippines	8
2025; Details	(Thailand); Bangkok	Thailand	3–2	Vietnam	Indonesia	3–1	Philippines	7

==== Medal summary ====
Below is the total medal count of SEA Games Women's Volleyball from 1977 to the present.

Rank	Nation	Gold	Silver	Bronze	Total
1	Thailand	17	2	3	22
2	Philippines	6	3	4	13
3	Indonesia	1	7	11	19
4	Vietnam	0	12	2	14
5	Myanmar	0	0	2	2
5	Singapore	0	0	2	2
7	Malaysia	0	0	1	1
Totals (7 entries)		24	24	25	73

=== Combined medal summary ===
Below is the combined medal count of SEA Games Men's and Women's indoor volleyball from 1977 to the present.

Rank	NOC	Gold	Silver	Bronze	Total
1	Thailand	26	7	8	41
2	Indonesia	13	15	13	41
3	Philippines	6	5	10	21
4	Myanmar	3	4	6	13
5	Vietnam	0	15	7	22
6	Cambodia	0	1	1	2
6	Malaysia	0	1	1	2
8	Singapore	0	0	4	4
Totals (8 entries)		48	48	50	146

== Beach Volleyball ==
The beach volleyball event was inaugurated in the 2003 edition of the SEA Games, however the sport was excluded from the games since the 2013 games. It made its return during the 2019 event.

=== Men's tournaments ===
Men's Beach Volleyball
Year	Host	Gold	Silver	Bronze
2003; Details	(Vietnam); Nam Định	Indonesia (INA); Agus Salim; Koko Prasetyo Darkuncoro	Vietnam (VIE); Cao Bảo Quốc; Phạm Bá Chung	Thailand (THA); Sonthi Bunrueang; Thawip Thongkamnerd
2005; Details	(Philippines); Bacolod	Indonesia (INA); Andy Ardiyansah; Rama Supriadi	Indonesia (INA); Koko Prasetyo Darkuncoro; Agus Salim	Thailand (THA); Sonthi Bunrueang; Borworn Yungtin
2007; Details	(Thailand); Nakhon Ratchasima	Indonesia (INA); Andy Ardiyansah; Koko Prasetyo Darkuncoro	Thailand (THA); Sataporn Sawangrueang; Borworn Yungtin	Cambodia (CAM); Kong Sopheap; Som Chamnap
2009; Details	(Laos); Vientiane	Indonesia (INA); Andy Ardiyansah; Koko Prasetyo Darkuncoro	Indonesia (INA); Dian Putra Santosa; Suratna	Vietnam (VIE); Nguyễn Trọng Quốc; Phạm Anh Tuấn
2011; Details	(Indonesia); Palembang	Indonesia (INA); Andy Ardiyansah; Koko Prasetyo Darkuncoro	Indonesia (INA); Dian Putra Santosa; Ade Candra Rachmawan	Thailand (THA); Kittipat Yungtin; Teerapat Pollueang
2013	(Myanmar); Naypyidaw	No tournament was held
2015	Singapore	No tournament was held
2017	(Malaysia); Kuala Lumpur	No tournament was held
2019; Details	(Philippines); Olongapo	Indonesia (INA); Ade Candra Rachmawan; Mohammad Ashfiya; Gilang Ramadhan; Danangsyah Yudistira Pribadi	Thailand (THA); Surin Jongklang; Banlue Nakarkhong; Nuttanon Inkiew; Sedtawat Padsawud	Philippines (PHI); Edmar Bonono; Jude Garcia; Jaron Requinton; James Buytrago
2021; Details	(Vietnam); Quảng Ninh	Indonesia (INA); Ade Candra Rachmawan; Mohammad Ashfiya; Gilang Ramadhan; Rendy Verdian Licardo	Thailand (THA); Surin Jongklang; Banlue Nakarkhong; Pithak Tipjan; Poravid Taovalo	Philippines (PHI); Jude Garcia; Anthony Lemuel Arbasto Jr. Alnakran Abdilla; Jaron Requinton
2023; Details	(Cambodia); Phnom Penh	Indonesia (INA); Gilang Ramadhan; Danangsyah Pribadi; Mohammad Ashfiya; Bintang Akbar	Thailand (THA); Surin Jongklang; Dunwinit Kaewsai; Pithak Tipjan; Poravid Taovato	Philippines (PHI); Jude Garcia; James Buytrago; Alnakran Abdilla; Jaron Requinton
2025; Details	(Thailand); Chonburi	Indonesia (INA); Bintang Akbar; Sofyan Rachman Efendi; Yosi Ariel Firnanda; Danangsyah Pribadi	Thailand (THA); Dunwinit Kaewsai; Wachirawit Muadpha; Netitorn Muneekul; Banlue Nakprakhong; Poravid Taovato	Vietnam (VIE); Lê Hoàng Ý Nguyễn Anh Tuấn; Nguyễn Lâm Tới; Trần Văn Việt

==== Medal summary ====
Rank	NOC	Gold	Silver	Bronze	Total
1	Indonesia	9	3	0	12
2	Thailand	0	5	3	8
3	Vietnam	0	1	2	3
4	Philippines	0	0	3	3
5	Cambodia	0	0	1	1
Totals (5 entries)		9	9	9	27

=== Women's tournaments ===
Women's Beach Volleyball
Year	Host	Gold	Silver	Bronze
2003; Details	(Vietnam); Nam Định	Thailand (THA); Jarunee Sannok; Kamoltip Kulna	Indonesia (INA); Timy Yudhani Rahayu; Sitti Nurjanah	Vietnam (VIE); Mai Thị Hoa; Đỗ Thị Vĩnh Linh
2005; Details	(Philippines); Bacolod	Thailand (THA); Kamoltip Kulna; Jarunee Sannok	Thailand (THA); Yupa Phokongploy; Usa Tenpaksee	Philippines (PHI); Heidi Illustre; Diane Pascua
2007; Details	(Thailand); Nakhon Ratchasima	Thailand (THA); Kamoltip Kulna; Yupa Phokongploy	Thailand (THA); Jarunee Sannok; Usa Tenpaksee	Malaysia (MAS); Beh Shun Thing; Luk Teck Hua
2009; Details	(Laos); Vientiane	Thailand (THA); Yupa Phokongploy; Kamoltip Kulna	Thailand (THA); Usa Tenpaksee; Jarunee Sannok	Malaysia (MAS); Beh Shun Thing; Luk Teck Hua
2011; Details	(Indonesia); Palembang	Thailand (THA); Kamoltip Kulna; Varapatsorn Radarong	Indonesia (INA); Ayu Cahyaning Siam; Dhita Juliana	Thailand (THA); Jarunee Sannok; Usa Tenpaksee
2013	(Myanmar); Naypyidaw	No tournament was held
2015	Singapore	No tournament was held
2017	(Malaysia); Kuala Lumpur	No tournament was held
2019; Details	(Philippines); Olongapo	Thailand (THA); Tanarattha Udomchavee; Rumpaipruet Numwong; Khanittha Hongpak; Varapatsorn Radarong	Indonesia (INA); Dhita Juliana; Putu Dini Jasita Utami; Desi Ratnasari; Alyssah Mutakharah	Philippines (PHI); Sisi Rondina; Bernadeth Pons; Dzi Gervacio; Floremel Rodriguez
2021; Details	(Vietnam); Quảng Ninh	Thailand (THA); Taravadee Naraphornrapat; Worapeerachayakorn Kongphopsarutawadee; Varapatsorn Radarong; Tanarattha Udomchavee	Indonesia (INA); Dhita Juliana; Putu Dini Jasita Utami; Nur Sari; Sari Hartati	Philippines (PHI); Sisi Rondina; Bernadeth Pons; Jovelyn Gonzaga; Floremel Rodriguez
2023; Details	(Cambodia); Phnom Penh	Thailand (THA); Taravadee Naraphornrapat; Worapeerachayakorn Kongphopsarutawadee; Varapatsorn Radarong; Tanarattha Udomchavee	Indonesia (INA); Dhita Juliana; Desi Ratnasari; Nur Sari; Yokebed Purari	Vietnam (VIE); Đinh Thị Mỹ Ngà; Nguyễn Lê Thị Tường Vy; Nguyễn Thị Thanh Trâm; Châu Ngọc Lan
2025; Details	(Thailand); Chonburi	Philippines (PHI); Gen Eslapor; Bernadeth Pons; Dij Rodriguez; Sisi Rondina; Sunny Villapando	Thailand (THA); Worapeerachayakorn Kongphopsarutawadee; Salinda Mungkhon; Taravadee Naraphornrapat; Rumpaipruet Numwong; Tanarattha Udomchavee	Vietnam (VIE); Châu Ngọc Lan; Đinh Thị Mỹ Ngà; Mai Hồng Hạnh; Nguyễn Lê Thị Tường Vy

==== Medal summary ====
Rank	NOC	Gold	Silver	Bronze	Total
1	Thailand	8	4	1	13
2	Philippines	1	0	3	4
3	Indonesia	0	5	0	5
4	Vietnam	0	0	3	3
5	Malaysia	0	0	2	2
Totals (5 entries)		9	9	9	27

=== Combined medal summary ===
Rank	NOC	Gold	Silver	Bronze	Total
1	Indonesia	9	8	0	17
2	Thailand	8	9	4	21
3	Philippines	1	0	6	7
4	Vietnam	0	1	5	6
5	Malaysia	0	0	2	2
6	Cambodia	0	0	1	1
Totals (6 entries)		18	18	18	54
