= Patcharee Sangmuang =

Thai volleyball player

Personal information
- Full name: Patcharee Sangmuang
- Nickname: Toy
- Nationality: Thai
- Born: 20 March 1978 (age 48); Nakhon Ratchasima, Thailand
- Height: 1.81 m (5 ft 11 in)
- Weight: 66 kg (146 lb)
- Spike: 3.11 m (122 in)
- Block: 2.98 m (117 in)

Volleyball information
- Position: Wing Spiker
- Current club: Opart 369
- Number: 4

National team
1996 – 2008	Thailand
Honours
Women's volleyball
Representing Thailand
Asian Championship
Bronze medal – third place	2001 Nakhon Ratchasima
Bronze medal – third place	2007 Nakhon Ratchasima
Southeast Asian Games
Gold medal – first place	1997 Jakarta	Team
Gold medal – first place	2001 Kuala Lumpur	Team
Gold medal – first place	2003 Hanoi	Team
Gold medal – first place	2005 Manila	Team
Gold medal – first place	2007 Nakhon Ratchasima	Team
Summer Universiade
Bronze medal – third place	2001 Beijing	Team

Patcharee Sangmuang (Thai: พัชรี แสงเมือง; RTGS: Phatchari Saengmueang; born 20 March 1978, Nakhon Ratchasima, Thailand) is the captain of the Thai women's national volleyball team, who made her international debut in the 13th Asian Games in Bangkok, Thailand. Her nickname is Toy (Thai: ต๋อย; RTGS: Toi)

== Career ==
Patcharee played with the Filipino team Adamson Lady Falcons in 2014 and with Thai club Maejo Cosmo Chiangrai in the 2015–16 season. She also played with the Filipino club Philippine Air Force in 2017.

== Clubs ==
- (China) Fujian Xi Meng Bao (2004)
- (Russia) Aurum (2005)
- Vietnam (2006–2008)
- (Thailand) Suan Sunandha (2011–2012)
- (Thailand) Ayutthaya (2012–2013)
- (Philippines) Colegio de San Juan de Letran (2012)
- (Philippines) Cagayan Valley Lady Rising Suns (2013)
- (Philippines) Adamson Lady Falcons (2014)
- (Philippines) Cagayan Valley Lady Rising Suns (2014)
- (Thailand) Bangkok (2014–2015)
- (Thailand) Maejo Cosmo Chiangrai (2015–2016)
- (Thailand) Thai-Denmark Nongrua (2016–2017)
- (Philippines) Philippine Air Force (2017)
- (Thailand) Cosmo Chiangrai (2017)
- (Philippines) Chooks-to-Go Tacloban Fighting Warays (2018)
- (Thailand) Opart 369 (2019)
