= Beach volleyball at the 2002 Asian Games – Men's tournament =

Men at the 2002 Asian Games
- Venue: Haeundae Beach
- Date: 29 September – 4 October 2002
- Competitors: 40 from 10 nations

Medalists
gold medal	Katsuhiro Shiratori; Satoshi Watanabe	Japan
silver medal	Agus Salim; Koko Prasetyo Darkuncoro	Indonesia
bronze medal	Li Hua; Zhao Chicheng	China

The Men's Beach volleyball Tournament at the 2002 Asian Games was held from September 29 to October 4, 2002 in Busan, South Korea.

== Schedule ==
All times are Korea Standard Time (UTC+09:00)

Date	Time	Event
Sunday, 29 September 2002	09:00	Preliminary round 1
Sunday, 29 September 2002	11:00	Preliminary round 2
Monday, 30 September 2002	09:00	Preliminary round 3
Monday, 30 September 2002	14:00	Preliminary round 4
Tuesday, 1 October 2002	09:00	Preliminary round 4
Tuesday, 1 October 2002	11:00	Preliminary round 5
Wednesday, 2 October 2002	09:00	1/8 finals
Thursday, 3 October 2002	10:00	1/4 finals
Thursday, 3 October 2002	14:00	Semifinals
Friday, 4 October 2002	10:00	3rd–4th place
Friday, 4 October 2002	14:00	Final

== Results ==
=== Preliminary round ===
==== Pool A ====
Pos	Team	Pld	W	L	Pts	SW	SL	SR	SPW	SPL	SPR	Qualification
1	Salim–Darkuncoro (INA)	4	4	0	8	8	1	8.000	183	145	1.262	1/8 finals
2	Sim–Lee (KOR)	4	2	2	6	6	6	1.000	222	219	1.014	1/8 finals
3	Mashebin–Sinkevich (KAZ)	4	2	2	6	5	5	1.000	171	177	0.966	1/8 finals
4	Bunrueang–Patsorn (THA)	4	2	2	6	5	6	0.833	193	204	0.946	1/8 finals
5	Sulaiman–Sabah (KUW)	4	0	4	4	2	8	0.250	176	200	0.880	

Source: Results

Date		Score		Set 1	Set 2	Set 3
29 Sep	Sim–Lee (KOR)	1–2	Mashebin–Sinkevich (KAZ)	17–21	21–11	12–15
29 Sep	Bunrueang–Patsorn (THA)	2–1	Sulaiman–Sabah (KUW)	21–18	18–21	15–12
29 Sep	Salim–Darkuncoro (INA)	2–0	Mashebin–Sinkevich (KAZ)	21–14	21–15	
29 Sep	Sulaiman–Sabah (KUW)	1–2	Sim–Lee (KOR)	21–17	17–21	22–24
30 Sep	Salim–Darkuncoro (INA)	2–0	Sulaiman–Sabah (KUW)	21–18	21–15	
30 Sep	Bunrueang–Patsorn (THA)	1–2	Sim–Lee (KOR)	24–22	18–21	13–15
30 Sep	Salim–Darkuncoro (INA)	2–1	Sim–Lee (KOR)	21–11	14–21	22–20
30 Sep	Mashebin–Sinkevich (KAZ)	1–2	Bunrueang–Patsorn (THA)	19–21	21–17	13–15
01 Oct	Mashebin–Sinkevich (KAZ)	2–0	Sulaiman–Sabah (KUW)	21–16	21–16	
01 Oct	Salim–Darkuncoro (INA)	2–0	Bunrueang–Patsorn (THA)	21–13	21–18	

==== Pool B ====
Pos	Team	Pld	W	L	Pts	SW	SL	SR	SPW	SPL	SPR	Qualification
1	Shiratori–Watanabe (JPN)	4	4	0	8	8	0	MAX	168	83	2.024	1/8 finals
2	Isa–Abdulla (BRN)	4	3	1	7	6	3	2.000	162	124	1.306	1/8 finals
3	Teng–Xu (CHN)	4	2	2	6	5	4	1.250	160	115	1.391	1/8 finals
4	Bairami–Al-Kuwari (QAT)	4	1	3	5	2	6	0.333	126	126	1.000	1/8 finals
5	John–Poothathan (IND)	4	0	4	0	0	8	0.000	0	168	0.000	

Source: Results

Date		Score		Set 1	Set 2	Set 3
29 Sep	Bairami–Al-Kuwari (QAT)	0–2	Isa–Abdulla (BRN)	14–21	19–21	
29 Sep	Teng–Xu (CHN)	2–0	John–Poothathan (IND)	Walkover		
29 Sep	Shiratori–Watanabe (JPN)	2–0	Isa–Abdulla (BRN)	21–17	21–13	
29 Sep	John–Poothathan (IND)	0–2	Bairami–Al-Kuwari (QAT)	Walkover		
30 Sep	Shiratori–Watanabe (JPN)	2–0	John–Poothathan (IND)	Walkover		
30 Sep	Teng–Xu (CHN)	2–0	Bairami–Al-Kuwari (QAT)	21–13	21–12	
30 Sep	Shiratori–Watanabe (JPN)	2–0	Bairami–Al-Kuwari (QAT)	21–12	21–14	
01 Oct	Isa–Abdulla (BRN)	2–1	Teng–Xu (CHN)	21–15	12–21	15–13
01 Oct	Shiratori–Watanabe (JPN)	2–0	Teng–Xu (CHN)	21–11	21–16	
01 Oct	Isa–Abdulla (BRN)	2–0	John–Poothathan (IND)	Walkover		

==== Pool C ====
Pos	Team	Pld	W	L	Pts	SW	SL	SR	SPW	SPL	SPR	Qualification
1	Ardiyansah–Supriadi (INA)	4	3	1	7	6	2	3.000	158	142	1.113	1/8 finals
2	Li–Zhao (CHN)	4	3	1	7	6	3	2.000	174	150	1.160	1/8 finals
3	Zabuslayev–Vorobyev (KAZ)	4	3	1	7	6	3	2.000	174	163	1.067	1/8 finals
4	Abdulqader–Al-Muzail (KUW)	4	1	3	5	4	6	0.667	158	178	0.888	1/8 finals
5	Ebrahim–Abdulameer (BRN)	4	0	4	4	0	8	0.000	137	168	0.815	

Source: Results

Date		Score		Set 1	Set 2	Set 3
29 Sep	Li–Zhao (CHN)	2–1	Abdulqader–Al-Muzail (KUW)	21–11	16–21	15–8
29 Sep	Ardiyansah–Supriadi (INA)	2–0	Ebrahim–Abdulameer (BRN)	21–19	21–16	
29 Sep	Zabuslayev–Vorobyev (KAZ)	2–1	Abdulqader–Al-Muzail (KUW)	21–14	18–21	15–12
29 Sep	Ebrahim–Abdulameer (BRN)	0–2	Li–Zhao (CHN)	18–21	18–21	
30 Sep	Ardiyansah–Supriadi (INA)	0–2	Li–Zhao (CHN)	14–21	18–21	
30 Sep	Zabuslayev–Vorobyev (KAZ)	2–0	Ebrahim–Abdulameer (BRN)	21–18	21–18	
01 Oct	Zabuslayev–Vorobyev (KAZ)	2–0	Li–Zhao (CHN)	21–19	21–19	
01 Oct	Abdulqader–Al-Muzail (KUW)	0–2	Ardiyansah–Supriadi (INA)	12–21	17–21	
01 Oct	Abdulqader–Al-Muzail (KUW)	2–0	Ebrahim–Abdulameer (BRN)	21–16	21–14	
01 Oct	Zabuslayev–Vorobyev (KAZ)	0–2	Ardiyansah–Supriadi (INA)	18–21	18–21	

==== Pool D ====
Pos	Team	Pld	W	L	Pts	SW	SL	SR	SPW	SPL	SPR	Qualification
1	Kirihara–Ozaki (JPN)	4	4	0	8	8	2	4.000	194	127	1.528	1/8 finals
2	Thongkamnerd–Sawangreung (THA)	4	3	1	7	7	2	3.500	174	121	1.438	1/8 finals
3	Rasheed–Anber (QAT)	4	2	2	6	4	4	1.000	138	121	1.140	1/8 finals
4	Choi–Park (KOR)	4	1	3	5	3	6	0.500	166	135	1.230	1/8 finals
5	Patlilla–Mohammed (IND)	4	0	4	0	0	8	0.000	0	168	0.000	

Source: Results

Date		Score		Set 1	Set 2	Set 3
29 Sep	Choi–Park (KOR)	0–2	Rasheed–Anber (QAT)	18–21	19–21	
29 Sep	Kirihara–Ozaki (JPN)	2–0	Patlilla–Mohammed (IND)	Walkover		
29 Sep	Thongkamnerd–Sawangreung (THA)	2–0	Rasheed–Anber (QAT)	21–13	21–14	
29 Sep	Patlilla–Mohammed (IND)	0–2	Choi–Park (KOR)	Walkover		
30 Sep	Thongkamnerd–Sawangreung (THA)	2–0	Patlilla–Mohammed (IND)	Walkover		
30 Sep	Kirihara–Ozaki (JPN)	2–1	Choi–Park (KOR)	21–18	15–21	15–13
01 Oct	Thongkamnerd–Sawangreung (THA)	2–0	Choi–Park (KOR)	21–19	21–16	
01 Oct	Rasheed–Anber (QAT)	0–2	Kirihara–Ozaki (JPN)	16–21	11–21	
01 Oct	Rasheed–Anber (QAT)	2–0	Patlilla–Mohammed (IND)	Walkover		
01 Oct	Thongkamnerd–Sawangreung (THA)	1–2	Kirihara–Ozaki (JPN)	25–23	17–21	6–15

=== Knockout round ===
1/8 finals
Salim–Darkuncoro (INA)	21	21
Bairami–Al-Kuwari (QAT)	12	10
Isa–Abdulla (BRN)	11	15
Mashebin–Sinkevich (KAZ)	21	21
Li–Zhao (CHN)	21	21
Rasheed–Anber (QAT)	17	17
Kirihara–Ozaki (JPN)	21	21
Abdulqader–Al-Muzail (KUW)	14	10
Ardiyansah–Supriadi (INA)	21	21
Choi–Park (KOR)	13	19
Thongkamnerd–Sawangreung (THA)	21	21
Zabuslayev–Vorobyev (KAZ)	12	16
Sim–Lee (KOR)	21	14
Teng–Xu (CHN)	23	21
Shiratori–Watanabe (JPN)	21	21
Bunrueang–Patsorn (THA)	15	13

1/4 finals
Salim–Darkuncoro (INA)	21	24
Mashebin–Sinkevich (KAZ)	19	22
Li–Zhao (CHN)	21	21
Kirihara–Ozaki (JPN)	18	17
Ardiyansah–Supriadi (INA)	21	20	15
Thongkamnerd–Sawangreung (THA)	12	22	13
Teng–Xu (CHN)	14	19
Shiratori–Watanabe (JPN)	21	21

Semifinals
Salim–Darkuncoro (INA)	24	24
Li–Zhao (CHN)	22	22
Ardiyansah–Supriadi (INA)	14	15
Shiratori–Watanabe (JPN)	21	21

Final
Salim–Darkuncoro (INA)	27	17
Shiratori–Watanabe (JPN)	29	21
3rd–4th place
Li–Zhao (CHN)	21	22
Ardiyansah–Supriadi (INA)	14	20

== Final standing ==
Rank	Team	Pld	W	L
1st place, gold medalist(s)	Katsuhiro Shiratori – Satoshi Watanabe (JPN)	8	8	0
2nd place, silver medalist(s)	Agus Salim – Koko Prasetyo Darkuncoro (INA)	8	7	1
3rd place, bronze medalist(s)	Li Hua – Zhao Chicheng (CHN)	8	6	2
4	Andy Ardiyansah – Supriadi (INA)	8	5	3
5	Teng Maomin – Xu Qiang (CHN)	6	3	3
5	Hayato Kirihara – Ko Ozaki (JPN)	6	5	1
5	Yevgeniy Mashebin – Sergey Sinkevich (KAZ)	6	3	3
5	Thawip Thongkamnerd – Sataporn Sawangreung (THA)	6	4	2
9	Osama Isa – Qader Abdulla (BRN)	5	3	2
9	Pavel Zabuslayev – Dmitriy Vorobyev (KAZ)	5	3	2
9	Choi Bu-sik – Park Sang-heun (KOR)	5	1	4
9	Sim Yeon-sub – Lee Byoung-hee (KOR)	5	2	3
9	Dawood Abdulqader – Adel Al-Muzail (KUW)	5	1	4
9	Ali Ishaq Bairami – Mohammed Salem Al-Kuwari (QAT)	5	1	4
9	Mubarak Rasheed – Mohammed Anber (QAT)	5	2	3
9	Sonthi Bunrueang – Petch Patsorn (THA)	5	2	3
17	Sadeq Ebrahim – Ali Abdulameer (BRN)	4	0	4
17	Pradeep John – Mohan Poothathan (IND)	4	0	4
17	Krishna Reddy Patlilla – Jameeluddin Mohammed (IND)	4	0	4
17	Ahmad Sulaiman – Mohammad Sabah (KUW)	4	0	4
