= 2007 Asian Beach Volleyball Championships =

International beach volleyball competition

- Location: Songkhla, Thailand
- Dates: 13–15 April 2007

The 2007 Asian Beach Volleyball Championships (7th tournament) was a beach volleyball event, that was held from April 13 to 15, 2007 in Samila Beach, Songkhla, Thailand. 46 teams including 22 women's squads from 15 AVC members participated in this tournament.

== Medal summary ==
Event	Gold	Silver	Bronze
Men	Indonesia; Andy Ardiyansah; Koko Prasetyo Darkuncoro	China; Gao Fangtian; Han Shengwei	New Zealand; Greg Lindsay; Russell Watson
Women	Thailand; Kamoltip Kulna; Yupa Phokongpoly	China; Yue Yuan; Zhang Wenwen	Thailand; Jarunee Sannok; Usa Tenpaksee

== Participating nations ==
=== Men ===
- Australia (2)
- China (2)
- Chinese Taipei (2)
- India (2)
- Indonesia (2)
- Iran (1)
- Japan (1)
- Malaysia (2)
- New Zealand (2)
- Philippines (1)
- Sri Lanka (2)
- Thailand (3)
- Vietnam (2)

=== Women ===
- Australia (1)
- China (2)
- Chinese Taipei (2)
- Indonesia (2)
- Japan (1)
- Kazakhstan (2)
- Malaysia (2)
- New Zealand (2)
- Philippines (1)
- Singapore (1)
- Sri Lanka (2)
- Thailand (3)
- Vietnam (1)

== Men's tournament ==
Semifinals
(Indonesia) Andy–Koko	21	21
(Thailand) Apichart–Sataporn	18	14
(China) Gao–Han	22	21	15
(New Zealand) Lindsay–Watson	24	14	13

Final
(Indonesia) Andy–Koko	21	21
(China) Gao–Han	14	12
3rd place
(Thailand) Apichart–Sataporn	16	19
(New Zealand) Lindsay–Watson	21	21

Rank	Team
1st place, gold medalist(s)	(Indonesia) Andy–Koko
2nd place, silver medalist(s)	(China) Gao–Han
3rd place, bronze medalist(s)	(New Zealand) Lindsay–Watson
4	(Thailand) Apichart–Sataporn
5	(Thailand) Borworn–Montree
5	(Philippines) Verayo–Tupaz
7	(Indonesia) Suratna–Agung
7	(Vietnam) Sơn–Thanh
9	(Thailand) Thawip–Sittichai
9	(Australia) Michel–Schumann
9	(Australia) Wyer–Smith
9	(China) Gao–Li
9	(Iran) Salagh–Farrokhi
9	(Vietnam) Thiện–Hào
9	(Japan) Suzuki–Kimura
9	(New Zealand) Leota–Heat
17	(Chinese Taipei) Chen–Lo
17	(Malaysia) Khoo–Rafiq
17	(Malaysia) Asruki–Kek
17	(India) Jameeluddin–Sashidar
17	(India) Mohan–John
17	(Sri Lanka) Dinesh–Pubudu
17	(Sri Lanka) Dammika–Mahesh
17	(Chinese Taipei) Lin–Tang

== Women's tournament ==
Semifinals
(Thailand) Kamoltip–Yupa	21	21
(Japan) Yanagawa–Sugawara	10	15
(Thailand) Jarunee–Usa	21	19	14
(China) Yue–Zhang	13	21	16

Final
(Thailand) Kamoltip–Yupa	21	21
(China) Yue–Zhang	14	10
3rd place
(Japan) Yanagawa–Sugawara	13	13
(Thailand) Jarunee–Usa	21	21

Rank	Team
1st place, gold medalist(s)	(Thailand) Kamoltip–Yupa
2nd place, silver medalist(s)	(China) Yue–Zhang
3rd place, bronze medalist(s)	(Thailand) Jarunee–Usa
4	(Japan) Yanagawa–Sugawara
5	(New Zealand) Grant–Blundell
5	(Kazakhstan) Storozhenko–Alenkina
7	(Malaysia) Luk–Beh
7	(Vietnam) Tiệp–Hồng
9	(China) Jiang–Jin
9	(Philippines) Laborte–Carolino
9	(Thailand) Yatika–Niphaporn
9	(New Zealand) Preston–Brown
9	(Sri Lanka) Geethika–Wanniarachchi
9	(Kazakhstan) Mashkova–Samoylenko
9	(Malaysia) Iswari–Yeoh
9	(Australia) Crewe–Spark
17	(Indonesia) Ayu Cahyaning–Timy
17	(Indonesia) Efa–Fitri
17	(Chinese Taipei) Chen–Hsieh
17	(Chinese Taipei) Chang–Hsieh
17	(Sri Lanka) Tharanga–Thakshila
17	(Singapore) Scanlon–Wu
