= Piyamas Koijapo =

Thai volleyball player (born 1978)

Personal information
- Full name: Piyamas Koijapo
- Nickname: Tae
- Nationality: Thai
- Born: October 23, 1978 (age 48); Nakhon Ratchasima, Thailand
- Height: 1.78 m (5 ft 10 in)
- Weight: 67 kg (148 lb)

Volleyball information
- Position: Wing-spiker

National team
1996–2008, 2011-2012	Thailand
Honours
Women's volleyball
Representing Thailand
Southeast Asian Games
Gold medal – first place	2001 Kuala Lumpur	Team
Gold medal – first place	2003 Hanoi	Team
Gold medal – first place	2005 Manila	Team
Gold medal – first place	2007 Nakhon Ratchasima	Team
Asian Championship
Bronze medal – third place	2001 Nakhon Ratchasima	Team
Bronze medal – third place	2007 Nakhon Ratchasima	Team

Piyamas Koijapo (Thai: ปิยะมาศ ค่อยจะโป๊ะ, born October 23, 1978, in Nakhon Ratchasima) is a Thai indoor volleyball player. She is a member of the Thailand women's national volleyball team.

== Clubs ==
- (Thailand) Pepsi (2007)
- (Vietnam) Quảng Ninh (2011) (loan)
- (Thailand) Chang (2012)
- (Thailand) Kathu Phuket (2011–2012)
- (Thailand) Sisaket (2012–2013)
