= Pongsakorn =

Pongsakorn (Thai: พงศกร, RTGS: Phongsakon, pronounced [pʰōŋ.sā.kɔ̄ːn]) is a masculine given name. Notable men with the given name include:

- Pongsakorn Nimawan, Thai volleyball player
- Pongsakorn Nondara, Thai weightlifter
- Pongsakorn Paeyo, Thai wheelchair racer
- Pongsakon Seerot, Thai professional footballer
