= 2010 Asian Beach Volleyball Championships =

International beach volleyball competition

- Location: Haikou, China
- Dates: 21–24 October 2010

The 2010 Asian Beach Volleyball Championship was a beach volleyball event, that was held from October 21 to 24, 2010 in Haikou, China.

== Medal summary ==
Event	Gold	Silver	Bronze
Men	China; Wu Penggen; Xu Linyin	Indonesia; Andy Ardiyansah; Koko Prasetyo Darkuncoro	China; Gao Peng; Li Jian
Women	China; Xue Chen; Zhang Xi	Kazakhstan; Tatyana Mashkova; Irina Tsimbalova	Japan; Shinako Tanaka; Sayaka Mizoe

== Participating nations ==
=== Men ===
- Australia (2)
- China (3)
- Hong Kong (2)
- Indonesia (2)
- Iran (2)
- Japan (2)
- Kazakhstan (2)
- Malaysia (2)
- Oman (2)
- Singapore (1)
- Sri Lanka (2)
- Thailand (2)
- Yemen (2)

=== Women ===
- China (3)
- Chinese Taipei (1)
- Hong Kong (2)
- Indonesia (2)
- Japan (2)
- Kazakhstan (2)
- Malaysia (2)
- Philippines (1)
- Singapore (1)
- Sri Lanka (2)
- Thailand (2)
- Vanuatu (1)
- Vietnam (2)

== Men's tournament ==
=== Preliminary round ===
==== Pool A ====
Pos	Team	Pld	W	L	Pts	SW	SL	SR	SPW	SPL	SPR
1	(China) Wu Penggen–Xu Linyin	2	2	0	4	2	0	MAX	42	29	1.448
2	(Kazakhstan) Alexey–Dmitriy	2	1	1	3	1	1	1.000	38	39	0.974
3	(Sri Lanka) Pubudu–Pradeep	2	0	2	2	0	2	0.000	30	42	0.714

Source: AVC

Date		Score	
21 Oct	Alexey–Dmitriy (Kazakhstan)	21–18	(Sri Lanka) Pubudu–Pradeep
21 Oct	Wu Penggen–Xu Linyin (China)	21–12	(Sri Lanka) Pubudu–Pradeep
21 Oct	Wu Penggen–Xu Linyin (China)	21–17	(Kazakhstan) Alexey–Dmitriy

==== Pool B ====
Pos	Team	Pld	W	L	Pts	SW	SL	SR	SPW	SPL	SPR
1	(Kazakhstan) Alexey–Alexandr	2	2	0	4	2	0	MAX	42	21	2.000
2	(Japan) Shinya–Yoshimumi	2	1	1	3	1	1	1.000	33	30	1.100
3	(Hong Kong) Wong Chun Wai–Wong Kwun Pong	2	0	2	2	0	2	0.000	18	42	0.429

Source: AVC

Date		Score	
21 Oct	Wong Chun Wai–Wong Kwun Pong (Hong Kong)	9–21	(Japan) Shinya–Yoshimumi
21 Oct	Sidorenko–Alexey–Alexandr (Kazakhstan)	21–12	(Japan) Shinya–Yoshimumi
21 Oct	Alexey–Alexandr (Kazakhstan)	21–9	(Hong Kong) Wong Chun Wai–Wong Kwun Pong

==== Pool C ====
Pos	Team	Pld	W	L	Pts	SW	SL	SR	SPW	SPL	SPR
1	(Indonesia) Andy–Koko	2	2	0	4	2	0	MAX	42	36	1.167
2	(Oman) Khalifa–Badar	2	1	1	3	1	1	1.000	39	39	1.000
3	(Iran) Farrokhi–Salagh	2	0	2	2	0	2	0.000	36	42	0.857

Source: AVC

Date		Score	
21 Oct	Farrokhi–Salagh (Iran)	18–21	(Oman) Khalifa–Badar
21 Oct	Andy–Koko (Indonesia)	21–18	(Oman) Khalifa–Badar
21 Oct	Andy–Koko (Indonesia)	21–18	(Iran) Farrokhi–Salagh

==== Pool D ====
Pos	Team	Pld	W	L	Pts	SW	SL	SR	SPW	SPL	SPR
1	(China) Gao Peng–Li Jian	2	2	0	4	2	0	MAX	42	18	2.333
2	(Iran) Reza Assari–Rahman	2	1	1	3	1	1	1.000	39	33	1.182
3	(Hong Kong) Wong Pui Lam–Kwok Wing Ho	2	0	2	2	0	2	0.000	12	42	0.286

Source: AVC

Date		Score	
21 Oct	Reza Assari–Rahman (Iran)	21–12	(Hong Kong) Wong Pui Lam–Kwok Wing Ho
21 Oct	Gao Peng–Li Jian (China)	WO	(Hong Kong) Wong Pui Lam–Kwok Wing Ho
21 Oct	Gao Peng–Li Jian (China)	21–18	(Iran) Reza Assari–Rahman

==== Pool E ====
Pos	Team	Pld	W	L	Pts	SW	SL	SR	SPW	SPL	SPR
1	(Sri Lanka) Mahesh–Wasantha	2	2	0	4	2	0	MAX	44	38	1.158
2	(Oman) Haitham–Ahmed	2	1	1	3	1	1	1.000	38	39	0.974
3	(Thailand) Sittichai–Teerapat	2	0	2	2	0	2	0.000	39	44	0.886

Source: AVC

Date		Score	
21 Oct	Mahesh–Wasantha (Sri Lanka)	21–17	(Oman) Haitham–Ahmed
21 Oct	Sittichai–Teerapat (Thailand)	18–21	(Oman) Haitham–Ahmed
21 Oct	Sittichai–Teerapat (Thailand)	21–23	(Sri Lanka) Mahesh–Wasantha

==== Pool F ====
Pos	Team	Pld	W	L	Pts	SW	SL	SR	SPW	SPL	SPR
1	(Indonesia) Ade Candra–Santoso	2	2	0	4	2	0	MAX	42	33	1.273
2	(Thailand) Panupong Toyam–Niphon	2	1	1	3	1	1	1.000	40	36	1.111
3	(Singapore) Soh Xing Hao–Yeo Kok How	2	0	2	2	0	2	0.000	29	42	0.690

Source: AVC

Date		Score	
21 Oct	Ade Candra–Santoso (Indonesia)	21–14	(Singapore) Soh Xing Hao–Yeo Kok How
21 Oct	Panupong Toyam–Niphon (Thailand)	21–15	(Singapore) Soh Xing Hao–Yeo Kok How
21 Oct	Panupong Toyam–Niphon (Thailand)	19–21	(Indonesia) Ade Candra–Santoso

==== Pool G ====
Pos	Team	Pld	W	L	Pts	SW	SL	SR	SPW	SPL	SPR
1	(Australia) Chris McHugh–Joshua Slack	3	3	0	6	3	0	MAX	63	45	1.400
2	(China) Ma Jingrong–Zhang Changzhong	3	2	1	5	2	1	2.000	58	37	1.568
3	(Malaysia) Khoo Chong Long–Rafi Asruki	3	1	2	4	1	2	0.500	73	62	1.177
4	(Yemen) Assar–Awadh	3	0	3	3	0	3	0.000	35	64	0.547

Source: AVC

Date		Score	
21 Oct	Khoo Chong Long–Rafi Asruki (Malaysia)	22–20	(Yemen) Assar–Awadh
21 Oct	Chris McHugh–Joshua Slack (Australia)	21–16	(China) Ma Jingrong–Zhang Changzhong
21 Oct	Khoo Chong Long–Rafi Asruki (Malaysia)	16–21	(China) Ma Jingrong–Zhang Changzhong
21 Oct	Chris McHugh–Joshua Slack (Australia)	21–15	(Yemen) Assar–Awadh
21 Oct	Khoo Chong Long–Rafi Asruki (Malaysia)	14–21	(Australia) Chris McHugh–Joshua Slack
21 Oct	Ma Jingrong–Zhang Changzhong (China)	WO	(Yemen) Assar–Awadh

==== Pool H ====
Pos	Team	Pld	W	L	Pts	SW	SL	SR	SPW	SPL	SPR
1	(Japan) Kentaro Asahi–Katsuhiro Shiratori	3	3	0	6	3	0	MAX	63	37	1.703
2	(Australia) Sam John Boehm–Isaac Kapa	3	2	1	5	2	1	2.000	59	60	0.983
3	(Malaysia) Yogeswaran–Beh Kiang Yao	3	1	2	4	1	2	0.500	53	61	0.869
4	(Yemen) Saeed–Aiman	3	0	3	3	0	3	0.000	46	63	0.730

Source: AVC

Date		Score	
21 Oct	Kentaro Asahi–Katsuhiro Shiratori (Japan)	21–13	(Yemen) Saeed–Aiman
21 Oct	Sam John Boehm–Isaac Kapa (Australia)	21–4	(Malaysia) Yogeswaran–Beh Kiang Yao
21 Oct	Kentaro Asahi–Katsuhiro Shiratori (Japan)	21–7	(Malaysia) Yogeswaran–Beh Kiang Yao
21 Oct	Sam John Boehm–Isaac Kapa (Australia)	21–14	(Yemen) Saeed–Aiman
21 Oct	Kentaro Asahi–Katsuhiro Shiratori (Japan)	21–17	(Australia) Sam John Boehm–Isaac Kapa
21 Oct	Yogeswaran–Beh Kiang Yao (Malaysia)	21–19	(Yemen) Saeed–Aiman

=== Knockout round ===
Round of 16; 22 October
(China) Wu Penggen–Xu Linyin	21	15	15
(Australia) Sam John Boehm–Isaac Kapa	9	21	10
(Japan) Kentaro Asahi–Katsuhiro Shiratori	18	21	15
(China) Ma Jingrong–Zhang Changzhong	21	15	11
(Sri Lanka) Mahesh–Wasantha	20	19
(Kazakhstan) Alexey–Dmitriy	22	21
(China) Gao Peng–Li Jian	21	21
(Japan) Shinya–Yoshimumi	11	9
(Indonesia) Andy–Koko	21	21
(Oman) Haitham–Ahmed	15	14
(Indonesia) Ade Candra–Santoso	21	21
(Oman) Khalifa–Badar	16	15
(Australia) Chris McHugh–Joshua Slack	17	21	15
(Thailand) Panupong Toyam–Niphon	21	18	11
(Kazakhstan) Alexey–Alexandr	18	21	15
(Iran) Reza Assari–Rahman	21	17	12

Quarterfinals; 22 October
(China) Wu Penggen–Xu Linyin	21	24
(Japan) Kentaro Asahi–Katsuhiro Shiratori	18	16
(Kazakhstan) Alexey–Dmitriy	14	12
(China) Gao Peng–Li Jian	21	21
(Indonesia) Andy–Koko	23	21	15
(Indonesia) Ade Candra–Santoso	25	18	7
(Australia) Chris McHugh–Joshua Slack	19	15
(Kazakhstan) Alexey–Alexandr	21	21

Semifinals; 23 October
(China) Wu Penggen–Xu Linyin	19	21	15
(China) Gao Peng–Li Jian	21	18	9
(Indonesia) Andy–Koko	21	15	15
(Kazakhstan) Alexey–Alexandr	18	21	13

Final; 24 October
(China) Wu Penggen–Xu Linyin	21	21
(Indonesia) Andy–Koko	18	16
3rd place
(China) Gao Peng–Li Jian	19	21	15
(Kazakhstan) Alexey–Alexandr	21	16	8

== Women's tournament ==
=== Preliminary round ===
==== Pool A ====
Pos	Team	Pld	W	L	Pts	SW	SL	SR	SPW	SPL	SPR
1	(China) Xue Chen–Zhang Xi	2	2	0	4	2	0	MAX	42	18	2.333
2	(Vanuatu) Elwin Miller–Henriette Iatika	2	1	1	3	1	1	1.000	32	32	1.000
3	(Singapore) Feng Hui Sai–Zi Hui Huang	2	0	2	2	0	2	0.000	18	42	0.429

Source: AVC

Date		Score	
21 Oct	Feng Hui Sai–Zi Hui Huang (Singapore)	11–21	(Vanuatu) Elwin Miller–Henriette Iatika
21 Oct	Xue Chen–Zhang Xi (China)	21–11	(Vanuatu) Elwin Miller–Henriette Iatika
21 Oct	Xue Chen–Zhang Xi (China)	21–7	(Singapore) Feng Hui Sai–Zi Hui Huang

==== Pool B ====
Pos	Team	Pld	W	L	Pts	SW	SL	SR	SPW	SPL	SPR
1	(China) Ying Huang–Yuan Yue	2	2	0	4	2	0	MAX	42	21	2.000
2	(Kazakhstan) Rakhmatulina–Lyudmila	2	1	1	3	1	1	1.000	38	35	1.086
3	(Hong Kong) Wong Wai Fong–Wong Yuen Mei	2	0	2	2	0	2	0.000	18	42	0.429

Source: AVC

Date		Score	
21 Oct	Rakhmatulina–Lyudmila (Kazakhstan)	21–14	(Hong Kong) Wong Wai Fong–Wong Yuen Mei
21 Oct	Ying Huang–Yuan Yue (China)	21–4	(Hong Kong) Wong Wai Fong–Wong Yuen Mei
21 Oct	Ying Huang–Yuan Yue (China)	21–17	(Kazakhstan) Rakhmatulina–Lyudmila

==== Pool C ====
Pos	Team	Pld	W	L	Pts	SW	SL	SR	SPW	SPL	SPR
1	(Thailand) Usa Tenpaksee–Jarunee Sannok	2	2	0	4	2	0	MAX	42	38	1.105
2	(Indonesia) Ayu Cahyaning–Kapasiang	2	1	1	3	1	1	1.000	40	37	1.081
3	(China) Changning Zhang–Wang Fan	2	0	2	2	0	2	0.000	35	42	0.833

Source: AVC

Date		Score	
21 Oct	Ayu Cahyaning–Kapasiang (Indonesia)	21–16	(China) Changning Zhang–Wang Fan
21 Oct	Usa Tenpaksee–Jarunee Sannok (Thailand)	21–19	(China) Changning Zhang–Wang Fan
21 Oct	Usa Tenpaksee–Jarunee Sannok (Thailand)	21–19	(Indonesia) Ayu Cahyaning–Kapasiang

==== Pool D ====
Pos	Team	Pld	W	L	Pts	SW	SL	SR	SPW	SPL	SPR
1	(Thailand) Yupa Phokongploy–Kamoltip Kulna	2	2	0	4	2	0	MAX	42	36	1.167
2	(Japan) Mutsumi Ozaki–Hiroyo	2	1	1	3	1	1	1.000	40	27	1.481
3	(Sri Lanka) Sujeewa–Geethika	2	0	2	2	0	2	0.000	23	42	0.548

Source: AVC

Date		Score	
21 Oct	Mutsumi Ozaki–Hiroyo (Japan)	21–6	(Sri Lanka) Sujeewa–Geethika
21 Oct	Yupa Phokongploy–Kamoltip Kulna (Thailand)	21–17	(Sri Lanka) Sujeewa–Geethika
21 Oct	Yupa Phokongploy–Kamoltip Kulna (Thailand)	21–19	(Japan) Mutsumi Ozaki–Hiroyo

==== Pool E ====
Pos	Team	Pld	W	L	Pts	SW	SL	SR	SPW	SPL	SPR
1	(Chinese Taipei) Kou Naihan–Huimin Chang	2	1	1	3	1	1	1.000	41	34	1.206
2	(Philippines) Johanna Carpio–Nerissa Bautista	2	1	1	3	1	1	1.000	33	34	0.971
3	(Vietnam) Đỗ Thị Hậu–Ngô Võ Thanh Loan	2	1	1	3	1	1	1.000	35	41	0.854

Source: AVC

Date		Score	
21 Oct	Đỗ Thị Hậu–Ngô Võ Thanh Loan (Vietnam)	13–21	(Philippines) Johanna Carpio–Nerissa Bautista
21 Oct	Kou Naihan–Huimin Chang (Chinese Taipei)	21–12	(Philippines) Johanna Carpio–Nerissa Bautista
21 Oct	Kou Naihan–Huimin Chang (Chinese Taipei)	20–22	(Vietnam) Đỗ Thị Hậu–Ngô Võ Thanh Loan

==== Pool F ====
Pos	Team	Pld	W	L	Pts	SW	SL	SR	SPW	SPL	SPR
1	(Kazakhstan) Tatyana–Irina	2	2	0	4	2	0	MAX	42	20	2.100
2	(Indonesia) Irawati–Wijayanti	2	1	1	3	1	1	1.000	32	31	1.032
3	(Malaysia) Luk Teck Eng–Tan Chiew Lee	2	0	2	2	0	2	0.000	19	42	0.452

Source: AVC

Date		Score	
21 Oct	Irawati–Wijayanti (Indonesia)	21–10	(Malaysia) Luk Teck Eng–Tan Chiew Lee
21 Oct	Tatyana–Irina (Kazakhstan)	21–9	(Malaysia) Luk Teck Eng–Tan Chiew Lee
21 Oct	Tatyana–Irina (Kazakhstan)	21–11	(Indonesia) Irawati–Wijayanti

==== Pool G ====
Pos	Team	Pld	W	L	Pts	SW	SL	SR	SPW	SPL	SPR
1	(Japan) Shinako Tanaka–Sayaka Mizoe	2	2	0	4	2	0	MAX	42	21	2.000
2	(Malaysia) Beh Shun Thing–Luk Teck Hua	2	1	1	3	1	1	1.000	37	31	1.194
3	(Sri Lanka) Pathakada–Gunasinghe	2	0	2	2	0	2	0.000	15	42	0.357

Source: AVC

Date		Score	
21 Oct	Beh Shun Thing–Luk Teck Hua (Malaysia)	21–10	(Sri Lanka) Pathakada–Gunasinghe
21 Oct	Shinako Tanaka–Sayaka Mizoe (Japan)	21–5	(Sri Lanka) Pathakada–Gunasinghe
21 Oct	Shinako Tanaka–Sayaka Mizoe (Japan)	21–16	(Malaysia) Beh Shun Thing–Luk Teck Hua

==== Pool H ====
Pos	Team	Pld	W	L	Pts	SW	SL	SR	SPW	SPL	SPR
1	(Vietnam) Trương Thị Yến–Nguyễn Thị Mãi	1	1	0	2	1	0	MAX	21	17	1.235
2	(Hong Kong) Tse Wing Hung–Kong Cheuk Yee	1	0	1	1	0	1	0.000	17	21	0.810

Source: AVC

Date		Score	
21 Oct	Trương Thị Yến–Nguyễn Thị Mãi (Vietnam)	21–17	(Hong Kong) Tse Wing Hung–Kong Cheuk Yee

=== Knockout round ===
Round of 16; 22 October
(China) Xue Chen–Zhang Xi	21	21
(Japan) Mutsumi Ozaki–Hiroyo	12	11
(Vietnam) Trương Thị Yến–Nguyễn Thị Mãi	21	21
(Philippines) Johanna Carpio–Nerissa Bautista	16	15
(Chinese Taipei) Kou Naihan–Huimin Chang	21	21
(Malaysia) Beh Shun Thing–Luk Teck Hua	9	14
(Thailand) Yupa Phokongploy–Kamoltip Kulna	21	21
(Indonesia) Irawati–Wijayanti	13	10
(Thailand) Usa Tenpaksee–Jarunee Sannok	21	21
(Kazakhstan) Rakhmatulina–Lyudmila	12	12
(Kazakhstan) Tatyana–Irina	21	16	15
(Vanuatu) Elwin Miller–Henriette Iatika	11	21	12
(Japan) Shinako Tanaka–Sayaka Mizoe	21	21
(Hong Kong) Tse Wing Hung–Kong Cheuk Yee	16	15
(China) Ying Huang–Yuan Yue	21	21
(Indonesia) Ayu Cahyaning–Kapasiang	19	16

Quarterfinals; 22 October
(China) Xue Chen–Zhang Xi	21	21
(Vietnam) Trương Thị Yến–Nguyễn Thị Mãi	10	11
(Chinese Taipei) Kou Naihan–Huimin Chang	16	14
(Thailand) Yupa Phokongploy–Kamoltip Kulna	21	21
(Thailand) Usa Tenpaksee–Jarunee Sannok	20	12
(Kazakhstan) Tatyana–Irina	22	21
(Japan) Shinako Tanaka–Sayaka Mizoe	W	O
(China) Ying Huang–Yuan Yue

Semifinals; 23 October
(China) Xue Chen–Zhang Xi	21	21
(Thailand) Yupa Phokongploy–Kamoltip Kulna	17	16
(Kazakhstan) Tatyana–Irina	21	22
(Japan) Shinako Tanaka–Sayaka Mizoe	19	20

Final; 24 October
(China) Xue Chen–Zhang Xi	21	21
(Kazakhstan) Tatyana–Irina	13	7
3rd place
(Thailand) Yupa Phokongploy–Kamoltip Kulna	19	21	17
(Japan) Shinako Tanaka–Sayaka Mizoe	21	14	19
