= Volleyball at the 2007 SEA Games =

Volleyball at the 2007 SEA Games was held 2 venues

- Indoor Volleyball: Gymnasium 2, His Majesty the King's 80th Birthday Anniversary Stadium (5 December 2007), Nakhon Ratchasima, Thailand
- Beach Volleyball: Beach Volleyball Stadium, His Majesty the King's 80th Birthday Anniversary Stadium (5 December 2007), Nakhon Ratchasima, Thailand

== Medal table ==
* Host nation (Thailand)

Rank	Nation	Gold	Silver	Bronze	Total
1	Thailand (THA)*	2	2	1	5
2	Indonesia (INA)	2	0	1	3
3	Vietnam (VIE)	0	2	0	2
4	Cambodia (CAM)	0	0	1	1
4	Malaysia (MAS)	0	0	1	1
Totals (5 entries)		4	4	4	12

== Medalists ==
=== Beach volleyball ===
Event	Gold	Silver	Bronze
Men	Indonesia (INA); Andy Ardiyansah; Koko Prasetyo Darkuncoro	Thailand (THA); Sataporn Sawangrueang; Borworn Yungtin	Cambodia (CAM); Kong Sopheap; Som Chamnap
Women	Thailand (THA); Kamoltip Kulna; Yupa Phokongploy	Thailand (THA); Jarunee Sannok; Usa Tenpaksee	Malaysia (MAS); Beh Shun Thing; Luk Teck Hua

=== Indoor volleyball ===
Event	Gold	Silver	Bronze
Men	Indonesia (INA); Affan Priyo Wicaksono; Aris Achmad Risqon; Ayip Rizal; Brian Alfianto; Didi Irwadi; Erwin Rusni; Fadlan Abdul Karim; I Nyoman Rudi Tirtana; Joko Murdianto; Joni Sugiyanto; Muhammad Riviansyah; Nur Widayanto	Vietnam (VIE); Đặng Vũ Bôn; Huỳnh Văn Tuấn; Lê Bình Giang; Lê Hồng Huy; Ngô Văn Kiều; Nguyễn Duy Quang; Nguyễn Hữu Hà; Nguyễn Trường Giang; Nguyễn Xuân Thành; Phạm Minh Dũng; Phạm Phước Tiến; Phạm Văn Thành	Thailand (THA); Annop Auttakornsiripho; Attaphon Khemdaeng; Kitsada Somkane; Kittikun Sriutthawong; Pongsakorn Nimawan; Ratchapoom Samthong; Ronnarong Jarupeng; Sarayut Yutthayong; Supachai Jitjumroon; Supachai Sriphum; Surachai Churat; Wanchai Tabwises
Women	Thailand (THA); Amporn Hyapha; Malika Kanthong; Narumon Khanan; Nootsara Tomkom; Onuma Sittirak; Patcharee Saengmuang; Piyamas Koijapo; Pleumjit Thinkaow; Rattanaporn Sanuanram; Saymai Paladsrichuay; Wanna Buakaew; Wilavan Apinyapong	Vietnam (VIE); Bùi Thị Huệ; Đinh Thị Diệu Châu; Đỗ Thị Minh; Hà Thị Hoa; Lâm Thị Thu Sáu; Lê Thị Hồng; Lê Thị Mười; Nguyễn Thị Minh; Nguyễn Thị Ngọc Hoa; Nguyễn Thị Xuân; Phạm Thị Thu Trang; Vũ Thị Liễu	Indonesia (INA); Agustin Wulandhari; Berlian Marsheila; Dewi Wulandari; Dini Indahsari; Gunarti Indahyani; Helina Aprianti; Josefhin Tahalele; Maya Kurnia Indri; Mella Marshellyna; Rita Kurniati; Susanti Martalia; Yati Sri Susilowati

Preceded by 2005	Volleyball at the SEA Games; 2007 SEA Games	Succeeded by 2009
