= Philippine Volleyball Federation =

Volleyball governing body in the Philippines

- Sport: Volleyball
- Abbreviation: PVF
- Founded: 1961 (as Philippine Amateur Volleyball Association)
- Regional affiliation: Asian Volleyball Confederation
- President: Edgardo "Boy" Cantada
- Vice president(s): Mariano See-Diet (Luzon); Roger Banzuela (Visayas); Arnel Hajan (Mindanao)
- Secretary: Karl Geoffrey Chan; Gerard Cantada
- (Philippines)

The Philippine Volleyball Federation (formerly known as the Philippine Amateur Volleyball Association) was the governing body for volleyball in the Philippines from 1961 to 2015.

== History ==
Supt. Tomas de Castro held a meeting with Justice Roman Nolasco, Jose N. Reyes, Director for Playground and Recreation Bureau and businessman Tommy Teng to discuss plans to establish a sports association for volleyball in the Philippines on July 4, 1961. The meeting gave way to the establishment of the Philippine Amateur Volleyball Association (PAVA) under the Philippine Amateur Athletic Federation (PAAF). PAVA later became known as the Philippine Volleyball Federation in 2003.

=== 2014 leadership crisis ===
The leadership dispute arose when the PVF's elected vice president, Karl Chan, assumed the position of president, after its president, Gener Dungo (who was accused of mismanaging the funds of the PVF) filed an indefinite leave of absence. However, weeks after the formation of the 2015 national men's and women's teams, Dungo and his supporters held a special board meeting and claimed that he has the majority and backing of duly elected members of the PVF Board of Directors. Philippine Olympic Committee (POC) Vice President Joey Romasanta, said that the POC cannot recognize the newly formed squad until the leadership dispute between Chan and Dungo is settled. Romansata accused Dungo and general secretary general Otie Camangian of misleading the national team players that they have the authority to organize the national volleyball teams and asserts that the two are not the federation itself and says that they have to consult the other members of the federation first. Romansata also called for the resolution of the dispute through talks between the two parties.

== List of PAVA/PVF Presidents ==
PAVA

- Roman Nolasco (1961–64)
- Tomas de Castro (1965–75)
- Nemesio Yabut (1976–79)
- Godofredo Camacho (1979–82)
- Mariano Santiago (1982–85)
- Victorino Chavez (1986–94)
- Benigno Gopez (1995–1998)
- Luis Gepuela (1999–2002)

PVF

- Roger Banzuela (2003–2006)
- Pedro Mendoza Jr. (2007–2010)
- Gener Dungo (2010–2014)
- Karl Chan (2014)
- Edgardo Cantada (2014–2015)

Source: Philippine Volleyball Federation
Note: The position of President is disputed between in Dungo and Chan in 2014. Recognition of PVF was withdrawn in 2015 as the governing body of volleyball in the country.
