= Volleyball in the Philippines =

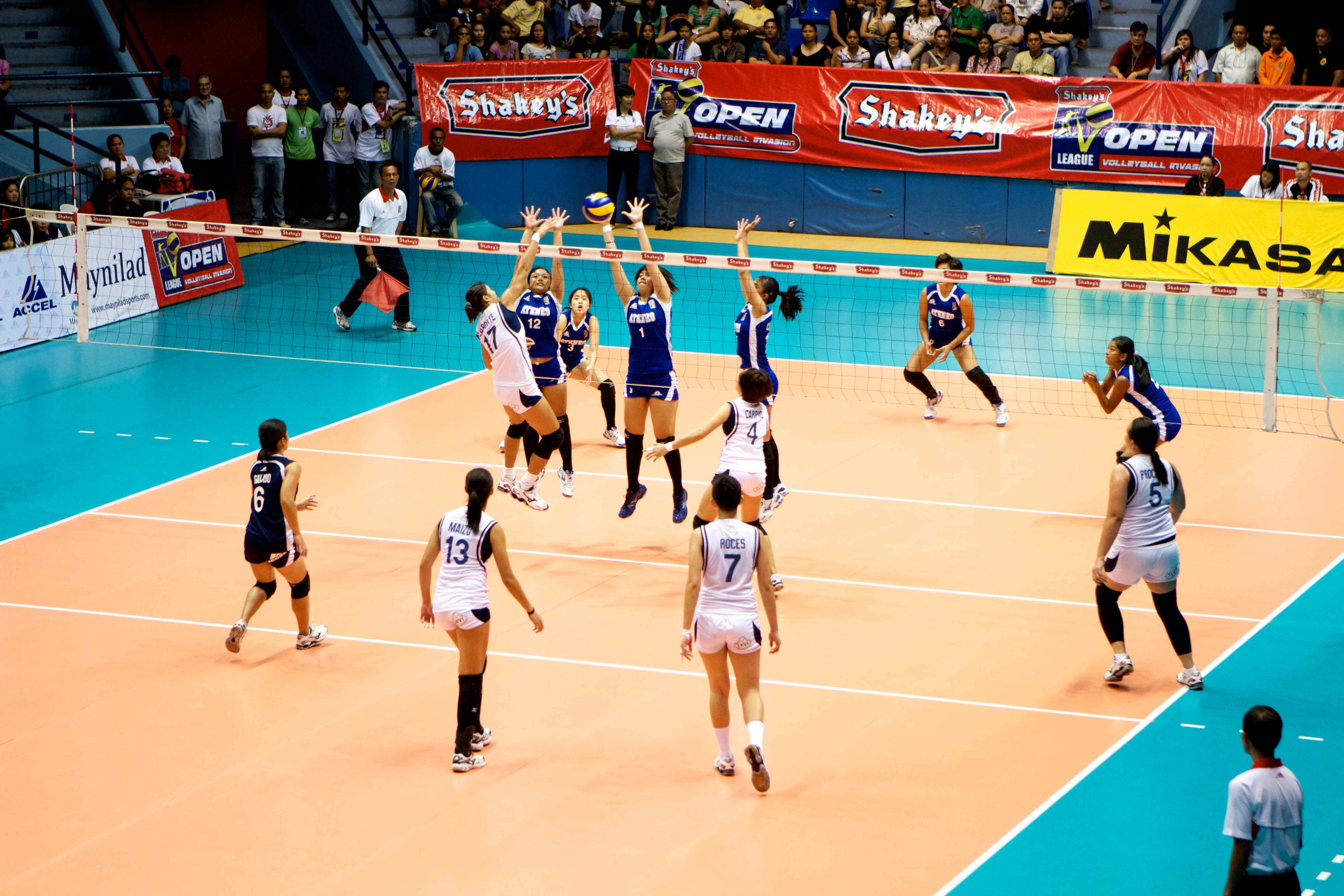
- A volleyball game in the 2011 Shakey's V-League.
- Country: Philippines
- Governing body: Philippine National Volleyball Federation
- National teams: Men's national team Women's national team
- First played: 1910
- Clubs: 6 (men); 12 (women)

Club competitions
- Spikers' Turf (men); Premier Volleyball League (women)

International competitions
- World championships (men, women); Asian championships (men, women)

Audience records
- Single match: Creamline vs. Choco Mucho (24,459)
- Season: 2023 PVL season (586,614)

The history of volleyball in the Philippines refers to the history of volleyball in the Philippines as a recreation and as a sport. Philippine volleyball history began in 1910 when the Philippines was a United States territory (1898–1935). The Filipinos have made significant contributions to volleyball in its evolution as a professional and international game. The Filipinos continued playing volleyball up to the modern-day period in its status as an independent republic (1946–present).

Volleyball in the Philippines is a female-dominated sports, with two commercial leagues serving as the de facto top-flight leagues in the country; the Philippine Super Liga and the Premier Volleyball League. The Spikers' Turf is the top-tier men's volleyball league in the Philippines.

== Introduction ==
It was introduced to the Filipinos by an American named Elwood S. Brown, the then Physical Director of the Young Men's Christian Association (YMCA). It became a popular game held in backyards and at beaches in the islands. At first, the Filipinos invented their own rules for the game. US soldiers who were assigned to the different islands of the Philippine during the period also helped in the widespread introduction of volleyball to the Filipinos. These American military servicemen encouraged the Filipinos to join them in playing during their time-off from military duties. Early in the history of the game of volleyball in the Philippines, the Filipinos used trees as makeshift net holders (the net was hung between the two chosen trees).

== Filipino contributions ==
The Filipinos contributed two items to modern-day volleyball:

=== Inspiration for the three-hit limit ===
The first contribution was that the Filipinos inspired American players to create the "three-hit limit" for each player in modern-day volleyball. This number of limits in hitting the ball was based by American volleyball players from the Filipino way of letting each player hit the ball before sending or "volleying" it over to the side of the opponent team. The Americans revised this method to become the "three-hit limit" because the old way of taking turns in hitting the ball took too much time, and had been observed to affect the intensity of the game and the motivation of the participating volleyballers (lessens the "challenge and the competitive nature" of the game).

=== Setting and spiking the ball ===
The second Filipino contribution was the "set and spike" maneuver, also known as "set and hit", "setting and spiking", or just "spike". A spike is a form of volleyball "attack" done by the player by jumping, raising one arm above the head and hitting the ball so it will move quickly down to the ground on the opponent's court. The set, on the other hand, is an over-hand pass done by the setter (another player) using the wrists to push finger-tips at the ball.

It was after accepting the new set of rules created by the Americans regarding the "three-hit limit" when the Filipino volleyball players at the time invented the "set and spike" maneuver. The new technique invented by the Filipinos prompted American enthusiasts and participants in volleyball to call it as the "Filipino bomb", because "spiking the ball" was like a "hit" or a form of "attack" that can squash or "kill" the opportunity of the opponent team to hit the ball back for a possible point or win. A more apt description of "hitting and spiking" is that it is "an offensive style of passing the ball in a high trajectory to be struck by another player."

== Associations ==
The Philippine Amateur Volleyball Association (PAVA) was founded by the Playground and Recreation Bureau (PRB) of the Philippines on July 4, 1961. It was renamed the Philippine Volleyball Federation (PVF) in 2003. The PVF was the recognized sporting body for volleyball until 2015, when recognition was transferred to the Larong Volleyball sa Pilipinas (LVPI), following a leadership dispute in the PVF. The LVPI itself was succeeded by the Philippine National Volleyball Federation (PNVF) in 2021. Some more Philippine volleyball associations include, Premier Volleyball League (PVL), Spiker's Turf (Men's counterpart of PVL).

== Leagues ==
Indoor volleyball:

- Premier Volleyball League
- Spikers' Turf
- Maharlika Pilipinas Volleyball Association

Beach volleyball:

- Beach Volleyball Republic

Collegiate:

- UAAP Volleyball Championship
- UAAP Beach Volleyball Championship
- NCAA Volleyball Championship (Philippines)
- NCAA Beach Volleyball Championship (Philippines)
- Cebu Schools Athletic Foundation, Inc.
- Shakey's Super League
- V-League (Philippines)

Defunct:

- Philippine Super Liga

== Participation and gender ==
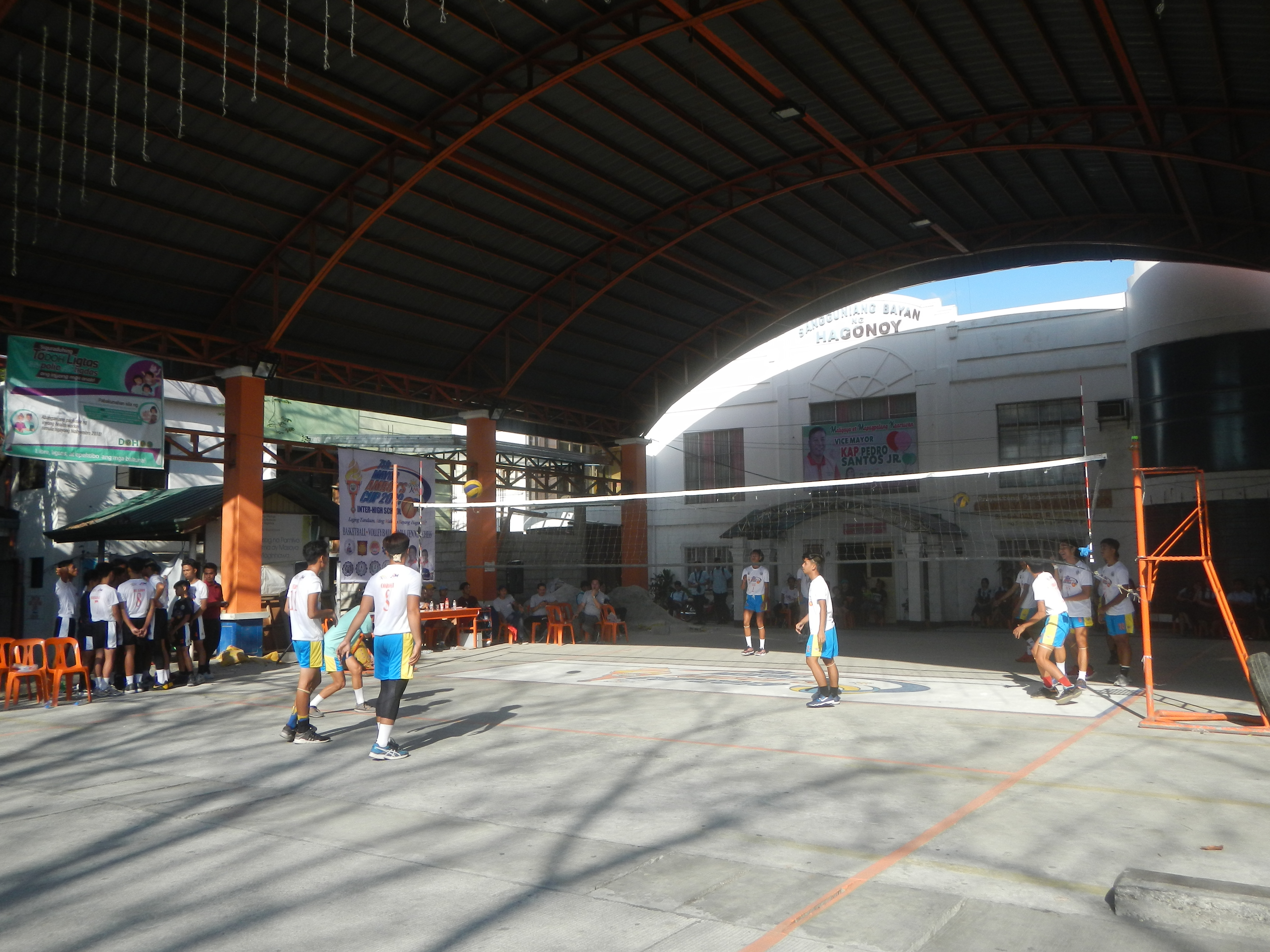
Filipino men playing volleyball in Bulacan.

Volleyball is a female-dominated sports in the Philippines with men's volleyball league games lagging behind their distaff counterpart in terms of attendances. There are several speculations raised to explain the popularity of women's volleyball in the Philippines over men's volleyball. This includes:

- Gender role belief which dictates that basketball is the "sport for men" with volleyball fulfilling the same role for women, a different style of play in men. Conversely traditional gender roles dictates that sports in general is for men only, and women's advocates used volleyball as a platform for women's participation in sports. Men's volleyball was also historically viewed as feminine.
- Difference in the prevalent style of play in men's and women's volleyball; men's volleyball is defined by power and speed which translates to quick play while the playing style of women is characterized by longer rallies which evokes drama for the spectators.
- Preference for women's volleyball due to a "sexuality" factor; the women's game is favored due to its physically attractive players – a controversial viewpoint which fans say downplays the merits of Philippine women's volleyball.

Men's volleyball gained traction after the Philippine national team clinched a silver medal in the 2019 Southeast Asian Games but was briefly disrupted by the COVID-19 pandemic.

== Records ==
The most attended volleyball match in Philippine history was the game two of the Premier Volleyball League (PVL) 2nd All-Filipino Conference Finals between the Creamline Cool Smashers and the Choco Mucho Flying Titans at the Araneta Coliseum held on December 15, 2023. It was attended by 24,459 people.

For men's UAAP volleyball, it would be the third game of Season 81 men's volleyball finals between NU Bulldogs and FEU Tamaraws and which was attended by 14,517 people.

== See also ==
- Men's national teams
  - Philippines men's national under-23 volleyball team
  - Philippines men's national under-19 volleyball team
  - Philippines men's national beach volleyball team
- Women's national teams
  - Philippines women's national volleyball team
  - Philippines women's national under-23 volleyball team
  - Philippines women's national under-21 volleyball team
  - Philippines women's national under-19 volleyball team
  - Philippines women's national under-17 volleyball team
  - Philippines women's national beach volleyball team
- Major collegiate and professional leagues
  - Premier Volleyball League
  - Spikers' Turf
  - NCAA Volleyball Championship
  - UAAP Volleyball Championship
