= Satoshi Watanabe (beach volleyball) =

Japanese beach volleyball player (born 1975)

Personal information
- Born: August 1, 1975 (age 51); Gunma, Japan
Medal record
Men's beach volleyball
Representing Japan
Asian Games
Gold medal – first place	2002 Busan	Men

Satoshi Watanabe (渡辺 聡, Watanabe Satoshi; born August 1, 1975) is a Japanese beach volleyball player who won a gold medal at the 2002 Asian Games.
