= 2001 Asian Beach Volleyball Championships =

International beach volleyball competition

- Location: Pasay, Philippines
- Dates: 30 March – 1 April 2001

The 2001 Asian Beach Volleyball Women's Championship or the 2001 Nestea Asian Beach Volleyball Women's Championship for sponsorship reasons, was a beach volleyball event, that was held from March 30 to April 1, 2001, in Pasay, Philippines. The event serves as the second edition of the Asian Beach Volleyball Championship. The tournament was held at the Cultural Center of the Philippines Complex.

== Medal summary ==
| Event | Gold | Silver | Bronze |
|---|---|---|---|
| Women | Japan; Chiaki Kusuhara; Ryoko Tokuno | China; Pan Wangye; You Wenhui | China; Han Bo; Sun Jing |

== Participating nations ==
- Australia (2)
- China (2)
- Hong Kong (2)
- Indonesia (2)
- Japan (3)
- New Zealand (1)
- Philippines (3)
- Thailand (2)

== Tournament ==
Semifinals
(Japan) Kusahara–Tokuno
(Thailand) Arlaisuk–Pangka
(China) Han–Sun
(China) Pan–You

Final
(Japan) Kusahara–Tokuno | 21 | 21
(China) Pan–You | 15 | 14
3rd place
(China) Han–Sun | 32 | 23
(Thailand) Arlaisuk–Pangka | 30 | 21

| Rank | Team |
|---|---|
| 1st place, gold medalist(s) | (Japan) Kusahara–Tokuno |
| 2nd place, silver medalist(s) | (China) Pan–You |
| 3rd place, bronze medalist(s) | (China) Han–Sun |
| 4 | (Thailand) Arlaisuk–Pangka |
| Unknown | (Indonesia) Rahayu–Siswardini |
| Unknown | Indonesia 2 |
| Unknown | (Japan) Nakamura–Ukigaya |
| Unknown | (Japan) Nakano–Tsuchiya |
| Unknown | (Hong Kong) Laprade–Tong Lai Ming |
| Unknown | (Australia) M. Avery–F. Avery |
| Unknown | (Australia) Lochowicz–Gerlic |
| Unknown | New Zealand |
| Unknown | (Philippines) Dosdos–Botor |
| Unknown | (Philippines) Buhawe–Tumayao |
| Unknown | (Philippines) Pintolo–Tabuena |
| Unknown | (Thailand) Kulna–Sannok |
