= Volleyball at the 2019 SEA Games – Men's beach volleyball tournament =

Men at the 2019 Southeast Asian Games
- Venue: Subic Tennis Courts
- Dates: 29 November – 6 December 2019
- Competitors: 16 from 8 nations

The men's beach volleyball tournament at the 2019 Southeast Asian Games took place at the Subic Tennis Court, Subic, Philippines from 29 November to 6 December 2019.

== Schedule ==
All times are Philippine Time (UTC+08:00)

Date	Time	Event
Friday, 29 November 2019	09:00	Preliminary round
Sunday, 1 December 2019	09:00	Preliminary round
Monday, 2 December 2019	14:00	Preliminary round
Tuesday, 3 December 2019	10:40	Preliminary round
Wednesday, 4 December 2019	14:00	Classification
Thursday, 5 December 2019	14:00	Semifinals
Friday, 6 December 2019	13:50	Bronze medal match
Friday, 6 December 2019	16:00	Gold medal match

== Results ==
=== Preliminary round ===
==== Pool A ====
Pos	Team	Pld	W	L	Pts	SW	SL	SR	SPW	SPL	SPR	Qualification
1	Thailand (THA)	6	6	0	12	12	1	12.000	271	210	1.290	Semifinals
2	Singapore (SGP)	8	4	4	12	8	10	0.800	311	342	0.909	Semifinals
3	Vietnam (VIE)	7	3	4	10	8	9	0.889	305	305	1.000	
4	Cambodia (CAM)	7	1	6	8	4	11	0.364	299	275	1.087	

Date	Match		Score		Set 1	Set 2	Set 3
29 November	1	Nuttanon Inkiew - Sedtawat Padsawud (THA)	2–0	Nguyễn Văn Nhã - Ton Long Nhật (VIE)	21–16	21–15	
29 November	1	Surin Jongklang - Banlue Nakprakhong (THA)	2–1	Nguyễn Văn Nhã - Ton Long Nhật (VIE)	19–21	22–20	15–11
29 November	2	Kingsley Tay - Fan Yang Shen (SGP)	2–0	Khlork Sim - Phavin Tat (CAM)	21–16	21–18	
29 November	2	Nicholas Kiu - Trevis Tan (SGP)	0–2	Sophea Chuk - Menghuong Thy (CAM)	19–21	5–21	
29 November	2	Kingsley Tay - Fan Yang Shen (SGP)	2–1	Sophea Chuk - Menghuong Thy (CAM)	16–21	22–20	15–13
1 December	3	Nuttanon Inkiew - Sedtawat Padsawud (THA)	2–0	Sophea Chuk - Menghuong Thy (CAM)	21–19	21–12	
1 December	3	Surin Jongklang - Banlue Nakprakhong (THA)	2–0	Khlork Sim - Phavin Tat (CAM)	21–11	21–15	
1 December	4	Kingsley Tay - Fan Yang Shen (SGP)	2–1	Nguyễn Lâm Tới - Trần Quang Vu (VIE)	15–21	21–16	15–9
1 December	4	Nicholas Kiu - Trevis Tan (SGP)	0–2	Nguyễn Văn Nhã - Ton Long Nhật (VIE)	14–21	15–21	
1 December	4	Kingsley Tay - Fan Yang Shen (SGP)	2–0	Nguyễn Văn Nhã - Ton Long Nhật (VIE)	21–18	21–17	
3 December	5	Nuttanon Inkiew - Sedtawat Padsawud (THA)	2–0	Nicholas Kiu - Trevis Tan (SGP)	21–18	21–15	
3 December	5	Surin Jongklang - Banlue Nakprakhong (THA)	2–0	Kingsley Tay - Fan Yang Shen (SGP)	26–24	21–13	
3 December	6	Khlork Sim - Phavin Tat (CAM)	0–2	Nguyễn Lâm Tới - Trần Quang Vu (VIE)	14–21	14–21	
3 December	6	Sophea Chuk - Menghuong Thy (CAM)	1–2	Nguyễn Văn Nhã - Ton Long Nhật (VIE)	21–17	20–22	16–18

==== Pool B ====
Pos	Team	Pld	W	L	Pts	SW	SL	SR	SPW	SPL	SPR	Qualification
1	Indonesia (INA)	6	6	0	12	12	0	MAX	252	151	1.669	Semifinals
2	Philippines (PHI)	6	4	2	10	8	4	2.000	224	201	1.114	Semifinals
3	Malaysia (MAS)	6	2	4	8	4	8	0.500	199	223	0.892	
4	Timor-Leste (TLS)	6	0	6	6	0	12	0.000	152	252	0.603	

Date	Match		Score		Set 1	Set 2	Set 3
29 November	1	James Buytrago - Jaron Requinton (PHI)	2–0	Jean Christian Alexandre da Silva - Xavier Robson Fernandes (TLS)	21–16	21–13	
29 November	1	Edmar Bonono - Jude Garcia (PHI)	2–0	Denyanus Belo - Aduano Silvano Feliz da Silva (TLS)	21–7	21–16	
29 November	2	Ade Rachmawan - Mohammad Ashfiya (INA)	2–0	Jackson Kiet Sing Ting - Raja Nazmi Saifuddin Bin Raja Hussin (MAS)	21–8	21–15	
29 November	2	Gilang Ramadhan - Danangsyah Pribadi (INA)	2–0	Rafi Asruki bin Nordin - Mohd Aizzat Mohd Zokri (MAS)	21–19	21–8	
1 December	3	Edmar Bonono - Jude Garcia (PHI)	2–0	Rafi Asruki bin Nordin - Mohd Aizzat Mohd Zokri (MAS)	21–14	21–12	
1 December	3	James Buytrago - Jaron Requinton (PHI)	2–0	Jackson Kiet Sing Ting - Raja Nazmi Saifuddin Bin Raja Hussin (MAS)	21–19	22–20	
1 December	4	Ade Rachmawan - Mohammad Ashfiya (INA)	2–0	Jean Christian Alexandre da Silva - Xavier Robson Fernandes (TLS)	21–12	21–10	
1 December	4	Gilang Ramadhan - Danangsyah Pribadi (INA)	2–0	Denyanus Belo - Aduano Silvano Feliz da Silva (TLS)	21–12	21–12	
2 December	5	James Buytrago - Jaron Requinton (PHI)	0–2	Ade Rachmawan - Mohammad Ashfiya (INA)	11–21	14–21	
2 December	5	Edmar Bonono - Jude Garcia (PHI)	0–2	Gilang Ramadhan - Danangsyah Pribadi (INA)	18–21	12–21	
2 December	6	Jackson Kiet Sing Ting - Raja Nazmi Saifuddin Bin Raja Hussin (MAS)	2–0	Jean Christian Alexandre da Silva - Xavier Robson Fernandes (TLS)	21–14	21–11	
2 December	6	Rafi Asruki bin Nordin - Mohd Aizzat Mohd Zokri (MAS)	2–0	Denyanus Belo - Aduano Silvano Feliz da Silva (TLS)	21–12	21–17	

=== Knockout round ===
Semifinals
A1	Thailand	2	2
B2	Philippines	0	0
B1	Indonesia	2	2
A2	Singapore	0	0

Finals
A1	Thailand	0	0
B1	Indonesia	2	2
Third place
A2	Singapore	2	0	0
B2	Philippines	1	2	2

Date	Match		Score		Set 1	Set 2	Set 3
5 December	Semi Finals 1	Surin Jongklang - Banlue Nakprakhong (THA)	2–0	James Buytrago - Jaron Requinton (PHI)	21–19	23–21	
5 December	Semi Finals 1	Nuttanon Inkiew - Sedtawat Padsawud (THA)	2–0	Edmar Bonono - Jude Garcia (PHI)	21–17	21–19	
5 December	Semi Finals 2	Ade Rachmawan - Mohammad Ashfiya (INA)	2–0	Kingsley Tay - Fan Yang Shen (SGP)	21–16	21–16	
5 December	Semi Finals 2	Gilang Ramadhan - Danangsyah Pribadi (INA)	2–0	Nicholas Kiu - Trevis Tan (SGP)	21–12	21–15	
6 December	Bronze Medal Match	James Buytrago - Jaron Requinton (PHI)	1–2	Kingsley Tay - Fan Yang Shen (SGP)	22–20	20–22	7–15
6 December	Bronze Medal Match	Edmar Bonono - Jude Garcia (PHI)	2–0	Nicholas Kiu - Trevis Tan (SGP)	21–14	21–14	
6 December	Bronze Medal Match	Edmar Bonono - Jude Garcia (PHI)	2–0	Kingsley Tay - Fan Yang Shen (SGP)	25–23	21–13	
5 December	Gold Medal Match	Surin Jongklang - Banlue Nakprakhong (THA)	0–2	Ade Rachmawan - Mohammad Ashfiya (INA)	18–21	9–21	
5 December	Gold Medal Match	Nuttanon Inkiew - Sedtawat Padsawud (THA)	0–2	Gilang Ramadhan - Danangsyah Pribadi (INA)	17–21	13–21	
