= Koko Prasetyo Darkuncoro =

Indonesian beach volleyball player (born 1981)

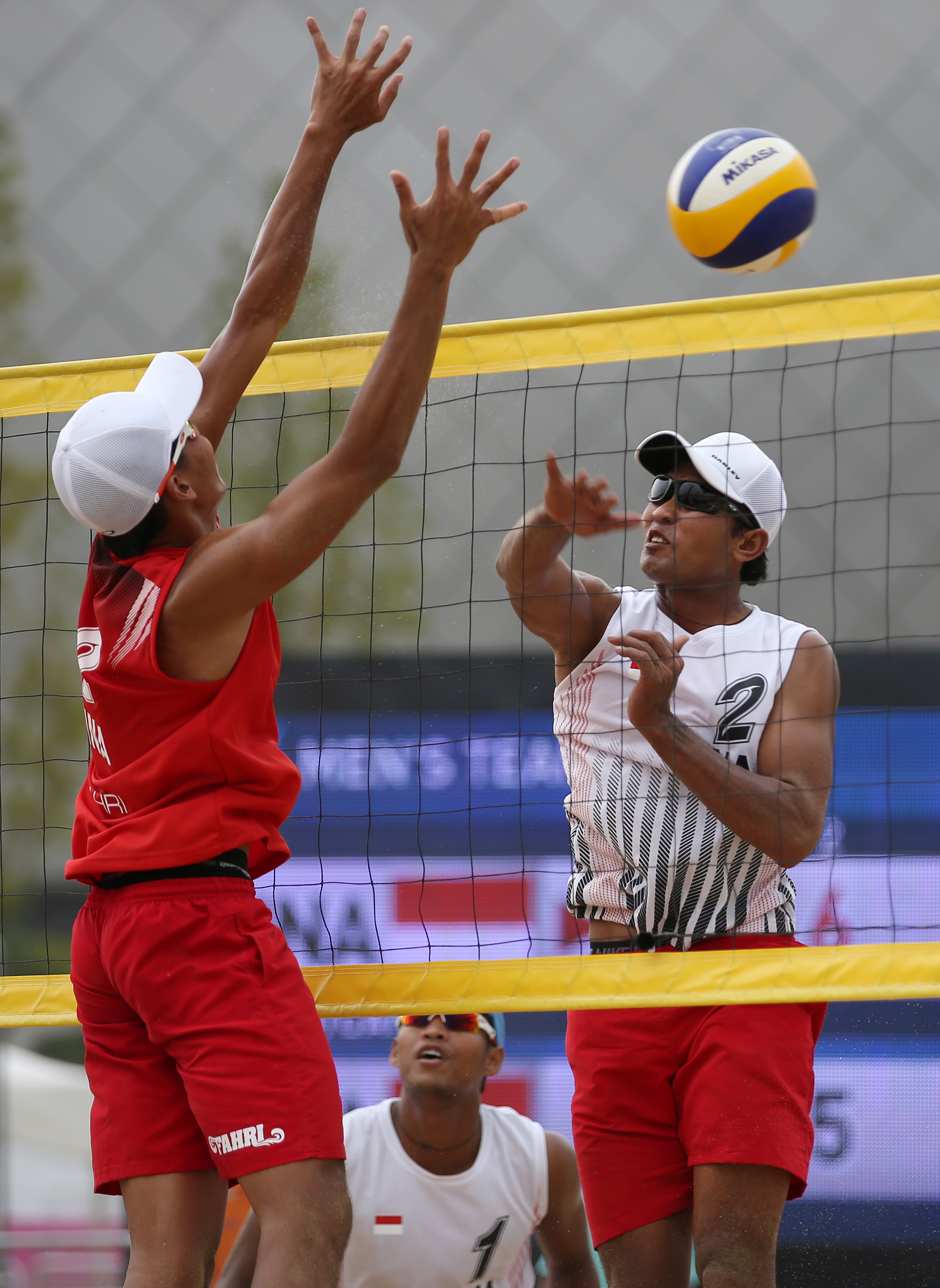

Personal information
- Born: October 2, 1981 (age 45); Jakarta, Indonesia
Medal record
Men's beach volleyball
Representing Indonesia
Asian Games
Silver medal – second place	2002 Busan	Men
Asian Beach Games
Gold medal – first place	2008 Bali	Men
Gold medal – first place	2012 Haiyang	Men
Gold medal – first place	2014 Phuket	Men
Asian Championships
Gold medal – first place	2005 Songkhla	Men
Gold medal – first place	2006 Kish Island	Men
Gold medal – first place	2007 Songkhla	Men
Gold medal – first place	2008 Hyderabad	Men
Silver medal – second place	2010 Haikou	Men
Bronze medal – third place	2012 Haikou	Men
Islamic Solidarity Games
Silver medal – second place	2013 Palembang	Men
SEA Games
Gold medal – first place	2007 Nakhon Ratchasima	Men
Gold medal – first place	2009 Vientiane	Men
Gold medal – first place	2011 Palembang	Men
Silver medal – second place	2005 Manila	Men

Koko Prasetyo Darkuncoro (born October 2, 1981, in Jakarta) is a beach volleyball player from Indonesia. He competed at the 2006 Asian Games, and won a silver medal at the 2002 Asian Games. At the 2008 Asian Beach Games he received a gold medal with partner Andy Ardiyansah.

Teamed-up with Ade Candra Rachmawan, they won the silver medal at the 2013 Islamic Solidarity Games. He and Rachmawan also competed at the 2014 Asian Games, finished in the fourth position after lost to Chinese pair in the bronze medal match. Darkuncoro and Rachmawan then claimed the gold medal at the 2014 Asian Beach Games in Phuket, Thailand.
