= 2006 Asian Beach Volleyball Championships =

International beach volleyball competition

- Location: Kish, Iran
- Dates: 12–15 March 2006

The 2006 Asian Beach Volleyball Championships (6th tournament) was a beach volleyball event, that was held from March 12 to 15, 2006 in Kish Island, Iran. The competition included only men's event.

== Medal summary ==
Event	Gold	Silver	Bronze
Men	Indonesia; Andy Ardiyansah; Koko Prasetyo Darkuncoro	Kazakhstan; Alexandr Dyachenko; Alexey Kulinich	Indonesia; Agus Salim; Supriadi

== Participating nations ==
- Indonesia (2)
- Iran (7)
- Kazakhstan (4)
- Oman (2)
- Thailand (1)

== Tournament ==
Semifinals
(Indonesia) Andy–Koko	2
(Iran) Sansabili–Salagh	0
(Kazakhstan) Dyachenko–Kulinich	2
(Indonesia) Salim–Supriadi	0

Final
(Indonesia) Andy–Koko	2
(Kazakhstan) Dyachenko–Kulinich	0
3rd place
(Iran) Sansabili–Salagh	0
(Indonesia) Salim–Supriadi	2

Rank	Team
1st place, gold medalist(s)	Indonesia 1
2nd place, silver medalist(s)	Kazakhstan 2
3rd place, bronze medalist(s)	Indonesia 2
4	(Iran) Saipa 1
5	Kazakhstan 1
6	(Iran) Saipa 2
7	(Iran) Sam Service
8	(Iran) Ajor Hadian
9	Thailand
9	(Iran) Samsung Kish
9	Kazakhstan 3
9	Kazakhstan 4
13	Oman 1
13	Oman 2
13	(Iran) Tojjar Kish
13	(Iran) Houd Bimaks
