= Pongsakorn Nimawan =

Thai volleyball player (born 1984)

Personal information
- Nickname: Tee
- Nationality: Thailand
- Born: 27 August 1984 (age 42)
- Height: 1.92 m (6 ft 4 in)
- Weight: 78 kg (172 lb)

Volleyball information
- Position: Outside hitter / Setter
- Number: 16

National team
2006–2010	Thailand
Honours
Men's volleyball
Representing Thailand
Southeast Asian Games
Bronze medal – third place	2007 Nakhon Ratchasima	Team

Pongsakorn Nimawan (Thai: พงศกร นิมะวัลย์) is a volleyball player from Thailand and is a member of the men's national volleyball team.

== Club ==
- (Thailand) Nakhon Ratchasima (2006–2016)
- (Thailand) Kasetsart (2016–2018)

== Awards ==
=== Clubs ===
- 2007–08 Thailand League - Champion, with Nakhon Ratchasima
- 2009–10 Thailand League - 3rd place, with Nakhon Ratchasima
- 2010–11 Thailand League - Runner-Up, with Nakhon Ratchasima
- 2012–13 Thailand League - Champion, with Nakhon Ratchasima
- 2013–14 Thailand League - Champion, with Nakhon Ratchasima
- 2014–15 Thailand League - Champion, with Nakhon Ratchasima
- 2016 Thai–Denmark Super League - Champion, with Nakhon Ratchasima
