= Volleyball at the 2005 SEA Games =

Volleyball (Indoor) at the 2005 SEA Games
- Venue: WNU Gymnasium
- Location: Bacolod, Negros Occidental
- Start date: November 27, 2005
- End date: December 5, 2005

Volleyball (Beach) at the 2005 SEA Games
- Venue: USLS Grounds
- Location: Bacolod, Negros Occidental
- Start date: November 28, 2005
- End date: December 2, 2005

Volleyball at the 2005 Southeast Asian Games logo

Volleyball at the 2005 SEA Games consisted of indoor volleyball held at the West Negros University Gymnasium in Bacolod, Negros Occidental, Philippines and beach volleyball held at the University of St. La Salle Grounds also in Bacolod.

Volleyball at the SEA Games was split into two categories: the traditional volleyball competition and beach volleyball.

== Medal table ==
* Host nation (Philippines)

Rank	Nation	Gold	Silver	Bronze	Total
1	Thailand (THA)	3	1	1	5
2	Indonesia (INA)	1	2	0	3
3	Vietnam (VIE)	0	1	1	2
4	Philippines (PHI)*	0	0	2	2
Totals (4 entries)		4	4	4	12

== Medal winners ==
Event	Gold	Silver	Bronze
Men's Indoor	Thailand (THA)	Indonesia (INA)	Vietnam (VIE)
Women's Indoor	Thailand (THA)	Vietnam (VIE)	Philippines (PHI)
Men's beach	Indonesia (INA); Andy Ardiyansah; Rama Supriadi	Indonesia (INA); Koko Prasetyo Darkuncoro; Agus Salim	Thailand (THA); Sonthi Bunrueang; Borworn Yungtin
Women's beach	Thailand (THA); Kamoltip Kulna; Jarunee Sannok	Thailand (THA); Yupa Phokongploy; Usa Tenpaksee	Philippines (PHI); Heidi Illustre; Diane Pascua

== Indoor Volleyball ==
=== Men's tournament ===
==== Preliminary round ====
Pos	Team	Pld	W	L	Pts	SPW	SPL	SPR	SW	SL	SR	Qualification
1	Thailand	4	4	0	8	327	310	1.055	12	4	3.000	Gold medal match
2	Indonesia	4	2	2	6	311	303	1.026	8	6	1.333	Gold medal match
3	Vietnam	4	2	2	6	293	283	1.035	7	6	1.167	
4	Myanmar	4	1	3	5	279	301	0.927	5	9	0.556	
5	Philippines (H)	4	1	3	5	276	289	0.955	4	10	0.400	

(H) Host

Date	Time		Score		Set 1	Set 2	Set 3	Set 4	Set 5	Total	Report
27 Nov	15:30	Thailand	3–1	Vietnam	17–25	25–20	25–19	25–16		92–80	Results
27 Nov	17:00	Philippines	0–3	Myanmar	16–25	18–25	27–29			61–79	Results
28 Nov	17:00	Indonesia	3–0	Myanmar	25–23	25–19	25–20			75–62	Results
29 Nov	15:30	Philippines	0–3	Vietnam	11–25	17–25	15–25			43–75	Results
29 Nov	17:00	Indonesia	0–3	Thailand	23–25	17–25	23–25			63–75	Results
30 Nov	17:00	Vietnam	3–0	Myanmar	25–22	25–19	25–17			75–58	Results
1 Dec	15:30	Philippines	1–3	Thailand	11–25	25–23	18–25	15–25		69–98	Results
1 Dec	17:00	Vietnam	0–3	Indonesia	25–27	17–25	21–25			63–77	Results
2 Dec	17:00	Myanmar	2–3	Thailand	26–24	25–21	20–25	21–25	6–15	98–110	Results
3 Dec	15:30	Philippines	3–2	Indonesia	28–26	25–17	22–25	22–25	13–15	110–108	Results

==== Gold medal match ====
Date	Time		Score		Set 1	Set 2	Set 3	Set 4	Set 5	Total	Report
4 Dec	14:00	Thailand	3–1	Indonesia	23–25	25–21	25–19	25–18		98–83	Results

==== Final standings ====
Rank	Team
1st place, gold medalist(s)	Thailand
2nd place, silver medalist(s)	Indonesia
3rd place, bronze medalist(s)	Vietnam
4	Myanmar
5	Philippines

=== Women's tournament ===
==== Preliminary round ====
Pos	Team	Pld	W	L	Pts	SPW	SPL	SPR	SW	SL	SR	Qualification
1	Thailand	4	4	0	8	327	193	1.694	12	0	MAX	Gold medal match
2	Vietnam	4	3	1	7	313	282	1.110	9	4	2.250	Gold medal match
3	Philippines (H)	4	2	2	6	301	303	0.993	7	7	1.000	
4	Indonesia	4	1	3	5	253	292	0.866	4	9	0.444	
5	Singapore	4	0	4	4	184	310	0.594	0	12	0.000	

(H) Host

Date	Time		Score		Set 1	Set 2	Set 3	Set 4	Set 5	Total	Report
27 Nov	14:00	Philippines	3–0	Singapore	25–9	25–16	25–12			75–37	Results
28 Nov	14:00	Thailand	3–0	Vietnam	25–16	25–20	27–25			77–61	Results
28 Nov	15:30	Philippines	3–1	Indonesia	25–18	22–25	25–20	25–19		97–82	Results
29 Nov	14:00	Indonesia	0–3	Thailand	20–25	15–25	14–25			49–75	Results
30 Nov	14:00	Indonesia	3–0	Singapore	25–16	25–9	25–23			75–48	Results
30 Nov	15:30	Philippines	1–3	Vietnam	25–13	17–25	22–25	21–25		85–88	Results
1 Dec	14:00	Singapore	0–3	Vietnam	19–25	17–25	12–25			48–75	Results
2 Dec	14:00	Indonesia	0–3	Vietnam	19–25	20–25	22–25			61–75	Results
2 Dec	15:30	Philippines	0–3	Thailand	19–25	11–25	12–25			42–75	Results
3 Dec	14:00	Thailand	3–0	Singapore	25–12	25–13	25–18			75–43	Results

==== Gold medal match ====
Date	Time		Score		Set 1	Set 2	Set 3	Set 4	Set 5	Total	Report
4 Dec	14:00	Thailand	3–0	Vietnam	25–20	25–10	25–20			75–50	Results

==== Final standings ====
Rank	Team
1st place, gold medalist(s)	Thailand
2nd place, silver medalist(s)	Vietnam
3rd place, bronze medalist(s)	Indonesia
4	Philippines
5	Singapore

== Beach Volleyball ==
=== Men's Finals ===
Country		Name	Score			
Country		Name	1	2	3	Final
Indonesia	INA	Andy; Supriadi	17	21	15	2
Indonesia	INA	Koko; Agusalim	21	16	12	1

=== Women's Finals ===
Country		Name	Score			
Country		Name	1	2	3	Final
Thailand	THA	Kamoltip; Jarunee	21	21		2
Thailand	THA	Yupa; Usa	12	19		0

Preceded by 2003	Volleyball at the SEA Games; 2005 SEA Games	Succeeded by 2007
