= Lyudmila Issayeva =

Kazakhstani volleyball player (born 1989)

Personal information
- Nationality: Kazakhstan
- Born: 26 September 1989 (age 37)
- Height: 1.84 m (6 ft 0 in)
- Weight: 70 kg (150 lb)
- Spike: 295 cm (116 in)
- Block: 280 cm (110 in)

Volleyball information
- Position: Middle blocker
- Number: 1

National team
Kazakhstan

Lyudmila Issayeva (born 26 September 1989) is a Kazakhstani female volleyball player. She is a member of the Kazakhstan women's national volleyball team. She was part of the Kazakhstani national team at the 2014 FIVB Volleyball Women's World Championship in Italy, and the 2016 FIVB Volleyball World Grand Prix.

On the club level, she played for Almaty in 2014, and at the 2017 Asian Women's Club Volleyball Championship.

== Clubs ==
- 2014 (Kazakhstan) Almaty
