= 2000 Asian Beach Volleyball Championships =

International beach volleyball competition

- Location: Yangjiang, China
- Dates: 18–20 August 2000

The 2000 Asian Beach Volleyball Championships was a beach volleyball event, that was held from August 18 to 20, 2000 in Yangjiang, China. The event serves as the inaugural edition of the Asian Beach Volleyball Championships.

35 teams participated in the competition, Craig Seuseu and Lefu Leaupepe from New Zealand won the men's gold medal while Fu Lingli and Lan Hong from the host nation won the women's title.

== Medal summary ==
Event	Gold	Silver	Bronze
Men	New Zealand; Craig Seuseu; Lefu Leaupepe	Indonesia; Irilkhun Shofanna; Markoji	Australia; Pat Gulline; Shaun Blackman
Women	China; Fu Lingli; Lan Hong	China; Sun Jing; Han Bo	Indonesia; Eta Kaize; Agustina Sineri
