= Mohan Poothathan =

Indian beach volleyball player

Mohan Poothathan is an Indian beach volleyball player. Along with Pradeep John, Poothathan entered the finals of the 15th Asian Games of 2006 held at Doha, Qatar defeating Philippines. But they lost to the Japanese pair of Kentaro Asahi and Katsuhiro Shiratori.

He competed at the 2012 Asian Beach Games in Haiyang, China.
