= Timy Yudhani Rahayu =

Indonesian beach volleyball player (born 1976)

Personal information
- Nationality: Indonesian
- Born: 11 December 1976 (age 49) Praya, West Nusa Tenggara, Indonesia

Sport
- Sport: Beach volleyball

Ni Putu Timy Yudhani Rahayu (born 11 December 1976) is an Indonesian beach volleyball player. She competed in the women's tournament at the 1996 Summer Olympics.
