= Jarunee Sannok =

Thai beach volleyball player

Personal information
- Born: 5 January 1981 (age 45); Thailand
- Height: 1.76 m (5 ft 9 in)
- Weight: 75 kg (165 lb)

Volleyball information
- Position: Wing Spiker
- Current club: Nakhon Ratchasima
- Number: 1

Career
Years	Teams
2014 - 2015	Nakhon Ratchasima
Medal record
Women's beach volleyball
Representing Thailand
Asian Games
Bronze medal – third place	2010 Guangzhou	Women's beach
Southeast Asian Games
Gold medal – first place	2005 Philippines	Women's beach
Silver medal – second place	2007 Nakhon Ratchasima	Women's beach
Silver medal – second place	2009 Vientiane	Women's beach
Bronze medal – third place	2011 Palembang	Women's beach

Jarunee Sannok (Thai: จารุณี สารนอก; born 5 January 1981) is a Thai beach volleyball player. She competed at the 2012 Asian Beach Games in Haiyang, China.
