= Andy Ardiyansah =

Indonesian beach volleyball player (born 1978)

Personal information
- Born: September 25, 1978 (age 48); Jakarta, Indonesia
Medal record
Men's beach volleyball
Representing Indonesia
Southeast Asian Games
Gold medal – first place	2005 Philippines	Men's beach
Gold medal – first place	2007 Nakhon Ratchasima	Men's beach
Gold medal – first place	2009 Vientiane	Men's beach
Gold medal – first place	2011 Palembang	Men's beach

Andy Ardiyansah (born September 25, 1978, in Jakarta) is a beach volleyball player from Indonesia. He competed at the 2006 Asian Games and got a gold medal at the 2008 Asian Beach Games, with his partner Koko Prasetyo Darkuncoro.
