= 2023 Asian Beach Volleyball Championships =

International beach volleyball competition

- Location: Fuzhou, China
- Dates: 23–26 June 2023

The 2023 Asian Beach Volleyball Championship was a beach volleyball event, held in June 2023 in Pingtan County, Fuzhou, China.

== Medal summary ==
| Event | Gold | Silver | Bronze |
|---|---|---|---|
| Men | Australia; Thomas Hodges; Zachery Schubert | Australia; Chris McHugh; Paul Burnett | Thailand; Pithak Tipjan; Poravid Taovato |
| Women | China; Xia Xinyi; Xue Chen | Thailand; Taravadee Naraphornrapat; Worapeerachayakorn Kongphopsarutawadee | China; Mushajiang Aheidan; Wang Jingzhe |

== Participating nations ==
=== Men ===
- Australia (3)
- China (4)
- Hong Kong (2)
- India (1)
- Indonesia (2)
- Iran (3)
- Japan (2)
- Kazakhstan (3)
- New Zealand (3)
- Oman (2)
- Philippines (2)
- Qatar (2)
- Thailand (3)

=== Women ===
- Australia (4)
- China (5)
- Hong Kong (2)
- Japan (4)
- Kazakhstan (3)
- New Zealand (2)
- Macau (1)
- Philippines (1)
- Thailand (3)
- Vanuatu (1)

== Men's tournament ==
=== Preliminary round ===
==== Pool A ====
| Pos | Team | Pld | W | L | Pts | SW | SL | SR | SPW | SPL | SPR |
|---|---|---|---|---|---|---|---|---|---|---|---|
| 1 | (China) Ha Likejiang–Wu Jiaxin | 3 | 3 | 0 | 6 | 6 | 0 | MAX | 126 | 64 | 1.969 |
| 2 | (Kazakhstan) Aldash–Gurin | 3 | 2 | 1 | 5 | 4 | 3 | 1.333 | 119 | 110 | 1.082 |
| 3 | (Thailand) Intuch–I. Nuttanon | 3 | 1 | 2 | 4 | 3 | 4 | 0.750 | 112 | 117 | 0.957 |
| 4 | (Hong Kong) W.L. Lam–K.Y. Wong | 3 | 0 | 3 | 3 | 0 | 6 | 0.000 | 60 | 126 | 0.476 |

Source: AVC

| Date | | Score | | Set 1 | Set 2 | Set 3 |
|---|---|---|---|---|---|---|
| 23 Jun | Ha Likejiang–Wu Jiaxin (China) | 2–0 | (Hong Kong) W.L. Lam–K.Y. Wong | 21–13 | 21–5 | |
| 23 Jun | Intuch–I. Nuttanon (Thailand) | 1–2 | (Kazakhstan) Aldash–Gurin | 21–18 | 15–21 | 11–15 |
| 23 Jun | Ha Likejiang–Wu Jiaxin (China) | 2–0 | (Kazakhstan) Aldash–Gurin | 21–11 | 21–12 | |
| 23 Jun | Intuch–I. Nuttanon (Thailand) | 2–0 | (Hong Kong) W.L. Lam–K.Y. Wong | 21–11 | 21–10 | |
| 24 Jun | Ha Likejiang–Wu Jiaxin (China) | 2–0 | (Thailand) Intuch–I. Nuttanon | 21–9 | 21–14 | |
| 24 Jun | Aldash–Gurin (Kazakhstan) | 2–0 | (Hong Kong) W.L. Lam–K.Y. Wong | 21–13 | 21–8 | |

==== Pool B ====
| Pos | Team | Pld | W | L | Pts | SW | SL | SR | SPW | SPL | SPR |
|---|---|---|---|---|---|---|---|---|---|---|---|
| 1 | (Qatar) Cherif–Ahmed | 3 | 3 | 0 | 6 | 6 | 0 | MAX | 126 | 85 | 1.482 |
| 2 | (Iran) Salemi B.–S. Shekar | 3 | 2 | 1 | 5 | 4 | 3 | 1.333 | 127 | 121 | 1.050 |
| 3 | (Japan) Furuta–Dylan | 3 | 1 | 2 | 4 | 2 | 5 | 0.400 | 115 | 130 | 0.885 |
| 4 | (China) Salamu A.–Lyu L. | 3 | 0 | 3 | 3 | 2 | 6 | 0.333 | 120 | 152 | 0.789 |

Source: AVC

| Date | | Score | | Set 1 | Set 2 | Set 3 |
|---|---|---|---|---|---|---|
| 23 Jun | Cherif–Ahmed (Qatar) | 2–0 | (China) Salamu A.–Lyu L. | 21–17 | 21–15 | |
| 23 Jun | Furuta–Dylan (Japan) | 0–2 | (Iran) Salemi B.–S. Shekar | 12–21 | 22–24 | |
| 23 Jun | Cherif–Ahmed (Qatar) | 2–0 | (Iran) Salemi B.–S. Shekar | 21–16 | 21–12 | |
| 23 Jun | Furuta–Dylan (Japan) | 2–1 | (China) Salamu A.–Lyu L. | 20–22 | 21–12 | 15–9 |
| 24 Jun | Cherif–Ahmed (Qatar) | 2–0 | (Japan) Furuta–Dylan | 21–12 | 21–13 | |
| 24 Jun | Salemi B.–S. Shekar (Iran) | 2–1 | (China) Salamu A.–Lyu L. | 21–12 | 18–21 | 15–12 |

==== Pool C ====
| Pos | Team | Pld | W | L | Pts | SW | SL | SR | SPW | SPL | SPR |
|---|---|---|---|---|---|---|---|---|---|---|---|
| 1 | (China) J. Li–Wang Y.W. | 3 | 2 | 1 | 5 | 4 | 2 | 2.000 | 125 | 103 | 1.214 |
| 2 | (Australia) Hodges–Schubert | 3 | 2 | 1 | 5 | 5 | 2 | 2.500 | 148 | 128 | 1.156 |
| 3 | (Iran) A. Pourasgari–A. Aghajani | 3 | 2 | 1 | 5 | 4 | 3 | 1.333 | 136 | 119 | 1.143 |
| 4 | (Hong Kong) P.L. Wong–C.Y. Lau | 3 | 0 | 3 | 3 | 0 | 6 | 0.000 | 67 | 126 | 0.532 |

Source: AVC

| Date | | Score | | Set 1 | Set 2 | Set 3 |
|---|---|---|---|---|---|---|
| 23 Jun | Hodges–Schubert (Australia) | 2–0 | (Hong Kong) P.L. Wong–C.Y. Lau | 21–15 | 21–10 | |
| 23 Jun | J. Li–Wang Y.W. (China) | 2–0 | (Iran) A. Pourasgari–A. Aghajani | 21–16 | 21–16 | |
| 23 Jun | Hodges–Schubert (Australia) | 1–2 | (Iran) A. Pourasgari–A. Aghajani | 27–29 | 21–18 | 11–15 |
| 23 Jun | J. Li–Wang Y.W. (China) | 2–0 | (Hong Kong) P.L. Wong–C.Y. Lau | 21–9 | 21–15 | |
| 24 Jun | Hodges–Schubert (Australia) | 2–0 | (China) J. Li–Wang Y.W. | 21–17 | 26–24 | |
| 24 Jun | A. Pourasgari–A. Aghajani (Iran) | 2–0 | (Hong Kong) P.L. Wong–C.Y. Lau | 21–8 | 21–10 | |

==== Pool D ====
| Pos | Team | Pld | W | L | Pts | SW | SL | SR | SPW | SPL | SPR |
|---|---|---|---|---|---|---|---|---|---|---|---|
| 1 | (Australia) McHugh–Burnett | 3 | 3 | 0 | 6 | 6 | 0 | MAX | 126 | 87 | 1.448 |
| 2 | (Iran) Zargham–Mehdi | 3 | 2 | 1 | 5 | 4 | 3 | 1.333 | 136 | 134 | 1.015 |
| 3 | (China) Li Zhuoxin–Ch.Y. Liu | 3 | 1 | 2 | 4 | 3 | 4 | 0.750 | 125 | 137 | 0.912 |
| 4 | (New Zealand) Sadlier–Nicklin | 3 | 0 | 3 | 3 | 0 | 6 | 0.000 | 97 | 126 | 0.770 |

Source: AVC

| Date | | Score | | Set 1 | Set 2 | Set 3 |
|---|---|---|---|---|---|---|
| 23 Jun | McHugh–Burnett (Australia) | 2–0 | (Iran) Zargham–Mehdi | 21–16 | 21–15 | |
| 23 Jun | Li Zhuoxin–Ch.Y. Liu (China) | 2–0 | (New Zealand) Sadlier–Nicklin | 21–19 | 21–13 | |
| 23 Jun | McHugh–Burnett (Australia) | 2–0 | (New Zealand) Sadlier–Nicklin | 21–17 | 21–13 | |
| 23 Jun | Li Zhuoxin–Ch.Y. Liu (China) | 1–2 | (Iran) Zargham–Mehdi | 21–18 | 28–30 | 8–15 |
| 24 Jun | McHugh–Burnett (Australia) | 2–0 | (China) Li Zhuoxin–Ch.Y. Liu | 21–12 | 21–14 | |
| 24 Jun | Sadlier–Nicklin (New Zealand) | 0–2 | (Iran) Zargham–Mehdi | 19–21 | 16–21 | |

==== Pool E ====
| Pos | Team | Pld | W | L | Pts | SW | SL | SR | SPW | SPL | SPR |
|---|---|---|---|---|---|---|---|---|---|---|---|
| 1 | (Australia) Nicolaidis–Carracher | 3 | 3 | 0 | 6 | 6 | 0 | MAX | 126 | 93 | 1.355 |
| 2 | (New Zealand) Reid–McManaway | 3 | 2 | 1 | 5 | 4 | 3 | 1.333 | 135 | 124 | 1.089 |
| 3 | (Oman) Mazin–Nouh | 3 | 1 | 2 | 4 | 2 | 4 | 0.500 | 108 | 115 | 0.939 |
| 4 | (Kazakhstan) Kuleshov–Petrossyants | 3 | 0 | 3 | 3 | 1 | 6 | 0.167 | 104 | 141 | 0.738 |

Source: AVC

| Date | | Score | | Set 1 | Set 2 | Set 3 |
|---|---|---|---|---|---|---|
| 23 Jun | Nicolaidis–Carracher (Australia) | 2–0 | (Kazakhstan) Kuleshov–Petrossyants | 21–14 | 21–11 | |
| 23 Jun | Mazin–Nouh (Oman) | 0–2 | (New Zealand) Reid–McManaway | 19–21 | 15–21 | |
| 23 Jun | Nicolaidis–Carracher (Australia) | 2–0 | (New Zealand) Reid–McManaway | 21–19 | 21–17 | |
| 23 Jun | Mazin–Nouh (Oman) | 2–0 | (Kazakhstan) Kuleshov–Petrossyants | 21–17 | 21–14 | |
| 24 Jun | Nicolaidis–Carracher (Australia) | 2–0 | (Oman) Mazin–Nouh | 21–16 | 21–16 | |
| 24 Jun | Reid–McManaway (New Zealand) | 2–1 | (Kazakhstan) Kuleshov–Petrossyants | 21–17 | 21–23 | 15–8 |

==== Pool F ====
| Pos | Team | Pld | W | L | Pts | SW | SL | SR | SPW | SPL | SPR |
|---|---|---|---|---|---|---|---|---|---|---|---|
| 1 | (Thailand) T. Pithak–T. Poravid | 3 | 3 | 0 | 6 | 6 | 2 | 3.000 | 148 | 130 | 1.138 |
| 2 | (Kazakhstan) Yakovlev–Bogatu | 3 | 2 | 1 | 5 | 5 | 3 | 1.667 | 151 | 125 | 1.208 |
| 3 | (Indonesia) Bintang–Ashfiya | 3 | 1 | 2 | 4 | 4 | 4 | 1.000 | 139 | 133 | 1.045 |
| 4 | (India) Naresh–Raju | 3 | 0 | 3 | 3 | 0 | 6 | 0.000 | 76 | 126 | 0.603 |

Source: AVC

| Date | | Score | | Set 1 | Set 2 | Set 3 |
|---|---|---|---|---|---|---|
| 23 Jun | T. Pithak–T. Poravid (Thailand) | 2–0 | (India) Naresh–Raju | 21–17 | 21–11 | |
| 23 Jun | Yakovlev–Bogatu (Kazakhstan) | 2–1 | (Indonesia) Bintang–Ashfiya | 21–17 | 19–21 | 15–11 |
| 23 Jun | T. Pithak–T. Poravid (Thailand) | 2–1 | (Indonesia) Bintang–Ashfiya | 16–21 | 21–14 | 15–13 |
| 23 Jun | Yakovlev–Bogatu (Kazakhstan) | 2–0 | (India) Naresh–Raju | 21–7 | 21–15 | |
| 24 Jun | T. Pithak–T. Poravid (Thailand) | 2–1 | (Kazakhstan) Yakovlev–Bogatu | 22–20 | 17–21 | 15–13 |
| 24 Jun | Bintang–Ashfiya (Indonesia) | 2–0 | (India) Naresh–Raju | 21–14 | 21–12 | |

==== Pool G ====
| Pos | Team | Pld | W | L | Pts | SW | SL | SR | SPW | SPL | SPR |
|---|---|---|---|---|---|---|---|---|---|---|---|
| 1 | (Thailand) J. Surin–K. Dunwinit | 3 | 3 | 0 | 6 | 6 | 1 | 6.000 | 138 | 117 | 1.179 |
| 2 | (New Zealand) Hartles–O'Dea B. | 3 | 2 | 1 | 5 | 5 | 2 | 2.500 | 137 | 109 | 1.257 |
| 3 | (Japan) Shoji–Ikeda | 3 | 1 | 2 | 4 | 2 | 4 | 0.500 | 100 | 116 | 0.862 |
| 4 | (Philippines) Arbasto–Jaron | 3 | 0 | 3 | 3 | 0 | 6 | 0.000 | 93 | 126 | 0.738 |

Source: AVC

| Date | | Score | | Set 1 | Set 2 | Set 3 |
|---|---|---|---|---|---|---|
| 23 Jun | J. Surin–K. Dunwinit (Thailand) | 2–0 | (Philippines) Arbasto–Jaron | 21–12 | 21–18 | |
| 23 Jun | Shoji–Ikeda (Japan) | 0–2 | (New Zealand) Hartles–O'Dea B. | 9–21 | 15–21 | |
| 23 Jun | J. Surin–K. Dunwinit (Thailand) | 2–1 | (New Zealand) Hartles–O'Dea B. | 21–19 | 18–21 | 15–13 |
| 23 Jun | Shoji–Ikeda (Japan) | 2–0 | (Philippines) Arbasto–Jaron | 21–16 | 21–16 | |
| 24 Jun | J. Surin–K. Dunwinit (Thailand) | 2–0 | (Japan) Shoji–Ikeda | 21–15 | 21–19 | |
| 24 Jun | Hartles–O'Dea B. (New Zealand) | 2–0 | (Philippines) Arbasto–Jaron | 21–14 | 21–17 | |

==== Pool H ====
| Pos | Team | Pld | W | L | Pts | SW | SL | SR | SPW | SPL | SPR |
|---|---|---|---|---|---|---|---|---|---|---|---|
| 1 | (Indonesia) Sofyan–Danang | 3 | 3 | 0 | 6 | 6 | 0 | MAX | 126 | 96 | 1.313 |
| 2 | (Oman) Ahmed–Haitham | 3 | 2 | 1 | 5 | 4 | 3 | 1.333 | 133 | 113 | 1.177 |
| 3 | (Qatar) Abdallah–M. Ihab | 3 | 1 | 2 | 4 | 2 | 4 | 0.500 | 95 | 116 | 0.819 |
| 4 | (Philippines) Garcia–Buytrago | 3 | 0 | 3 | 3 | 1 | 6 | 0.167 | 112 | 141 | 0.794 |

Source: AVC

| Date | | Score | | Set 1 | Set 2 | Set 3 |
|---|---|---|---|---|---|---|
| 23 Jun | Ahmed–Haitham (Oman) | 2–1 | (Philippines) Garcia–Buytrago | 21–16 | 20–22 | 15–9 |
| 23 Jun | Abdallah–M. Ihab (Qatar) | 0–2 | (Indonesia) Sofyan–Danang | 9–21 | 19–21 | |
| 23 Jun | Ahmed–Haitham (Oman) | 0–2 | (Indonesia) Sofyan–Danang | 18–21 | 17–21 | |
| 23 Jun | Abdallah–M. Ihab (Qatar) | 2–0 | (Philippines) Garcia–Buytrago | 21–12 | 22–20 | |
| 24 Jun | Ahmed–Haitham (Oman) | 2–0 | (Qatar) Abdallah–M. Ihab | 21–14 | 21–10 | |
| 24 Jun | Sofyan–Danang (Indonesia) | 2–0 | (Philippines) Garcia–Buytrago | 21–16 | 21–17 | |

=== Knockout round ===
Round of 16; 24 June
(China) Ha Likejiang–Wu Jiaxin | 21 | 21
(Iran) Zargham–Mehdi | 14 | 15
(Iran) Salemi B.–S. Shekar | 19 | 21 | 15
(Indonesia) Sofyan–Danang | 21 | 14 | 8
(Australia) Nicolaidis–Carracher | 21 | 21
(Kazakhstan) Yakovlev–Bogatu | 16 | 12
(Oman) Ahmed–Haitham | 19 | 11
(Australia) McHugh–Burnett | 21 | 21
(China) J. Li–Wang Y.W. | 21 | 21
(New Zealand) Reid–McManaway | 17 | 15
(New Zealand) Hartles–O'Dea B. | 17 | 19
(Thailand) T. Pithak–T. Poravid | 21 | 21
(Thailand) J. Surin–K. Dunwinit | 21 | 16 | 5
(Australia) Hodges–Schubert | 16 | 21 | 15
(Kazakhstan) Aldash–Gurin | 12 | 16
(Qatar) Cherif–Ahmed | 21 | 21

Quarterfinals; 25 June
(China) Ha Likejiang–Wu Jiaxin | 17 | 19
(Iran) Salemi B.–S. Shekar | 21 | 21
(Australia) Nicolaidis–Carracher | 17 | 11
(Australia) McHugh–Burnett | 21 | 21
(China) J. Li–Wang Y.W. | 16 | 14
(Thailand) T. Pithak–T. Poravid | 21 | 21
(Australia) Hodges–Schubert | 27 | 21
(Qatar) Cherif–Ahmed | 25 | 19

Semifinals; 25 June
(Iran) Salemi B.–S. Shekar | 13 | 16
(Australia) McHugh–Burnett | 21 | 21
(Thailand) T. Pithak–T. Poravid | 18 | 16
(Australia) Hodges–Schubert | 21 | 21

Final; 26 June
(Australia) McHugh–Burnett | 17 | 18
(Australia) Hodges–Schubert | 21 | 21
3rd place
(Iran) Salemi B.–S. Shekar | 17 | 13
(Thailand) T. Pithak–T. Poravid | 21 | 21

== Women's tournament ==
=== Preliminary round ===
==== Pool A ====
| Pos | Team | Pld | W | L | Pts | SW | SL | SR | SPW | SPL | SPR |
|---|---|---|---|---|---|---|---|---|---|---|---|
| 1 | (China) M.M. Lin–J.J. Zeng | 2 | 1 | 1 | 3 | 3 | 2 | 1.500 | 89 | 85 | 1.047 |
| 2 | (Japan) Shiba–Maruyama | 2 | 1 | 1 | 3 | 3 | 3 | 1.000 | 105 | 104 | 1.010 |
| 3 | (Australia) Milutinovic–Fejes | 2 | 1 | 1 | 3 | 2 | 3 | 0.667 | 88 | 93 | 0.946 |

Source: AVC

| Date | | Score | | Set 1 | Set 2 | Set 3 |
|---|---|---|---|---|---|---|
| 23 Jun | Shiba–Maruyama (Japan) | 1–2 | (Australia) Milutinovic–Fejes | 23–21 | 16–21 | 12–15 |
| 23 Jun | M.M. Lin–J.J. Zeng (China) | 2–0 | (Australia) Milutinovic–Fejes | 21–18 | 21–13 | |
| 24 Jun | M.M. Lin–J.J. Zeng (China) | 1–2 | (Japan) Shiba–Maruyama | 21–18 | 13–21 | 13–15 |

==== Pool B ====
| Pos | Team | Pld | W | L | Pts | SW | SL | SR | SPW | SPL | SPR |
|---|---|---|---|---|---|---|---|---|---|---|---|
| 1 | (Thailand) Naraphornrapat–Worapeerachayakorn | 2 | 2 | 0 | 4 | 4 | 0 | MAX | 84 | 53 | 1.585 |
| 2 | (Japan) Suzuka–Reika | 2 | 1 | 1 | 3 | 2 | 2 | 1.000 | 74 | 63 | 1.175 |
| 3 | (Philippines) Rodriguez–Eslapor | 2 | 0 | 2 | 2 | 0 | 4 | 0.000 | 42 | 84 | 0.500 |

Source: AVC

| Date | | Score | | Set 1 | Set 2 | Set 3 |
|---|---|---|---|---|---|---|
| 23 Jun | Suzuka–Reika (Japan) | 2–0 | (Philippines) Rodriguez–Eslapor | 21–13 | 21–8 | |
| 23 Jun | Naraphornrapat–Worapeerachayakorn (Thailand) | 2–0 | (Philippines) Rodriguez–Eslapor | 21–13 | 21–8 | |
| 24 Jun | Naraphornrapat–Worapeerachayakorn (Thailand) | 2–0 | (Japan) Suzuka–Reika | 21–17 | 21–15 | |

==== Pool C ====
| Pos | Team | Pld | W | L | Pts | SW | SL | SR | SPW | SPL | SPR |
|---|---|---|---|---|---|---|---|---|---|---|---|
| 1 | (Japan) Ishii–Mizoe | 2 | 2 | 0 | 4 | 4 | 0 | MAX | 84 | 55 | 1.527 |
| 2 | (Australia) Phillips–Kendall | 2 | 1 | 1 | 3 | 2 | 3 | 0.667 | 90 | 80 | 1.125 |
| 3 | (Kazakhstan) Kabulbekova–Ivanchenko | 2 | 0 | 2 | 2 | 1 | 4 | 0.250 | 60 | 99 | 0.606 |

Source: AVC

| Date | | Score | | Set 1 | Set 2 | Set 3 |
|---|---|---|---|---|---|---|
| 23 Jun | Phillips–Kendall (Australia) | 2–1 | (Kazakhstan) Kabulbekova–Ivanchenko | 21–23 | 21–8 | 15–7 |
| 23 Jun | Ishii–Mizoe (Japan) | 2–0 | (Kazakhstan) Kabulbekova–Ivanchenko | 21–10 | 21–12 | |
| 24 Jun | Ishii–Mizoe (Japan) | 2–0 | (Australia) Phillips–Kendall | 21–14 | 21–19 | |

==== Pool D ====
| Pos | Team | Pld | W | L | Pts | SW | SL | SR | SPW | SPL | SPR |
|---|---|---|---|---|---|---|---|---|---|---|---|
| 1 | (Japan) Akiko–Yurika | 2 | 2 | 0 | 4 | 4 | 0 | MAX | 84 | 52 | 1.615 |
| 2 | (Thailand) Radarong–Udomchavee | 2 | 1 | 1 | 3 | 2 | 2 | 1.000 | 69 | 67 | 1.030 |
| 3 | (Kazakhstan) Ukolova–Rachenko | 2 | 0 | 2 | 2 | 0 | 4 | 0.000 | 50 | 84 | 0.595 |

Source: AVC

| Date | | Score | | Set 1 | Set 2 | Set 3 |
|---|---|---|---|---|---|---|
| 23 Jun | Radarong–Udomchavee (Thailand) | 2–0 | (Kazakhstan) Ukolova–Rachenko | 21–15 | 21–10 | |
| 23 Jun | Akiko–Yurika (Japan) | 2–0 | (Kazakhstan) Ukolova–Rachenko | 21–11 | 21–14 | |
| 24 Jun | Akiko–Yurika (Japan) | 2–0 | (Thailand) Radarong–Udomchavee | 21–15 | 21–12 | |

==== Pool E ====
| Pos | Team | Pld | W | L | Pts | SW | SL | SR | SPW | SPL | SPR |
|---|---|---|---|---|---|---|---|---|---|---|---|
| 1 | (China) X.Y. Xia–Xue | 2 | 2 | 0 | 4 | 4 | 0 | MAX | 84 | 58 | 1.448 |
| 2 | (Hong Kong) W.T. To–M.C. Wong | 2 | 1 | 1 | 3 | 2 | 3 | 0.667 | 84 | 93 | 0.903 |
| 3 | (Thailand) Charanrutwadee–Woranatchayakorn | 2 | 0 | 2 | 2 | 1 | 4 | 0.250 | 80 | 97 | 0.825 |

Source: AVC

| Date | | Score | | Set 1 | Set 2 | Set 3 |
|---|---|---|---|---|---|---|
| 23 Jun | Charanrutwadee–Woranatchayakorn (Thailand) | 1–2 | (Hong Kong) W.T. To–M.C. Wong | 21–19 | 18–21 | 12–15 |
| 23 Jun | X.Y. Xia–Xue (China) | 2–0 | (Hong Kong) W.T. To–M.C. Wong | 21–16 | 21–13 | |
| 24 Jun | X.Y. Xia–Xue (China) | 2–0 | (Thailand) Charanrutwadee–Woranatchayakorn | 21–16 | 21–13 | |

==== Pool F ====
| Pos | Team | Pld | W | L | Pts | SW | SL | SR | SPW | SPL | SPR |
|---|---|---|---|---|---|---|---|---|---|---|---|
| 1 | (China) Wang X.X.–Zhu Lingdi | 2 | 2 | 0 | 4 | 4 | 0 | MAX | 84 | 62 | 1.355 |
| 2 | (Australia) Bettenay–Stevens | 2 | 1 | 1 | 3 | 2 | 2 | 1.000 | 75 | 68 | 1.103 |
| 3 | (New Zealand) Stevenson–Vesty | 2 | 0 | 2 | 2 | 0 | 4 | 0.000 | 55 | 84 | 0.655 |

Source: AVC

| Date | | Score | | Set 1 | Set 2 | Set 3 |
|---|---|---|---|---|---|---|
| 23 Jun | Bettenay–Stevens (Australia) | 2–0 | (New Zealand) Stevenson–Vesty | 21–11 | 21–15 | |
| 23 Jun | Wang X.X.–Zhu Lingdi (China) | 2–0 | (New Zealand) Stevenson–Vesty | 21–10 | 21–19 | |
| 24 Jun | Wang X.X.–Zhu Lingdi (China) | 2–0 | (Australia) Bettenay–Stevens | 21–17 | 21–16 | |

==== Pool G ====
| Pos | Team | Pld | W | L | Pts | SW | SL | SR | SPW | SPL | SPR |
|---|---|---|---|---|---|---|---|---|---|---|---|
| 1 | (New Zealand) MacDonald–Zeimann | 3 | 3 | 0 | 6 | 6 | 1 | 6.000 | 133 | 89 | 1.494 |
| 2 | (China) J. Dong–Wang | 3 | 2 | 1 | 5 | 5 | 2 | 2.500 | 133 | 90 | 1.478 |
| 3 | (Hong Kong) Lo W.Y.–Yuen T.C. | 3 | 1 | 2 | 4 | 2 | 4 | 0.500 | 78 | 120 | 0.650 |
| 4 | (Macau) Law W.S.–Leong O.I. | 3 | 0 | 3 | 3 | 0 | 6 | 0.000 | 81 | 126 | 0.643 |

Source: AVC

| Date | | Score | | Set 1 | Set 2 | Set 3 |
|---|---|---|---|---|---|---|
| 23 Jun | J. Dong–Wang (China) | 2–0 | (Macau) Law W.S.–Leong O.I. | 21–15 | 21–8 | |
| 23 Jun | MacDonald–Zeimann (New Zealand) | 2–0 | (Hong Kong) Lo W.Y.–Yuen T.C. | 21–7 | 21–11 | |
| 23 Jun | J. Dong–Wang (China) | 2–0 | (Hong Kong) Lo W.Y.–Yuen T.C. | 21–13 | 21–5 | |
| 23 Jun | MacDonald–Zeimann (New Zealand) | 2–0 | (Macau) Law W.S.–Leong O.I. | 21–10 | 21–12 | |
| 24 Jun | J. Dong–Wang (China) | 1–2 | (New Zealand) MacDonald–Zeimann | 21–13 | 18–21 | 10–15 |
| 24 Jun | Lo W.Y.–Yuen T.C. (Hong Kong) | 2–0 | (Macau) Law W.S.–Leong O.I. | 21–17 | 21–19 | |

==== Pool H ====
| Pos | Team | Pld | W | L | Pts | SW | SL | SR | SPW | SPL | SPR |
|---|---|---|---|---|---|---|---|---|---|---|---|
| 1 | (China) Aheidan–J.Zh. Wang | 3 | 3 | 0 | 6 | 6 | 0 | MAX | 126 | 70 | 1.800 |
| 2 | (Australia) Johnson–Fleming | 3 | 2 | 1 | 5 | 4 | 2 | 2.000 | 110 | 92 | 1.196 |
| 3 | (Vanuatu) Lawac–Toko | 3 | 1 | 2 | 4 | 2 | 4 | 0.500 | 103 | 114 | 0.904 |
| 4 | (Kazakhstan) Tlevlessova–Tlevlessova | 3 | 0 | 3 | 3 | 0 | 6 | 0.000 | 63 | 126 | 0.500 |

Source: AVC

| Date | | Score | | Set 1 | Set 2 | Set 3 |
|---|---|---|---|---|---|---|
| 23 Jun | Johnson–Fleming (Australia) | 0–2 | (China) Aheidan–J.Zh. Wang | 14–21 | 12–21 | |
| 23 Jun | Lawac–Toko (Vanuatu) | 2–0 | (Kazakhstan) Tlevlessova–Tlevlessova | 21–15 | 21–15 | |
| 23 Jun | Johnson–Fleming (Australia) | 2–0 | (Kazakhstan) Tlevlessova–Tlevlessova | 21–7 | 21–11 | |
| 23 Jun | Lawac–Toko (Vanuatu) | 0–2 | (China) Aheidan–J.Zh. Wang | 16–21 | 13–21 | |
| 24 Jun | Johnson–Fleming (Australia) | 2–0 | (Vanuatu) Lawac–Toko | 21–15 | 21–17 | |
| 24 Jun | Tlevlessova–Tlevlessova (Kazakhstan) | 0–2 | (China) Aheidan–J.Zh. Wang | 7–21 | 8–21 | |

=== Knockout round ===
Round of 16; 24 June
(China) M.M. Lin–J.J. Zeng | 21 | 21
(Japan) Suzuka–Reika | 17 | 15
(Thailand) Radarong–Udomchavee | 8 | 12
(China) Aheidan–J.Zh. Wang | 21 | 21
(China) X.Y. Xia–Xue | 21 | 21
(Japan) Shiba–Maruyama | 18 | 12
(China) J. Dong–Wang | 21 | 22
(Japan) Akiko–Yurika | 18 | 20
(Japan) Ishii–Mizoe | 21 | 21
(Hong Kong) W.T. To–M.C. Wong | 8 | 7
(Australia) Phillips–Kendall | 21 | 22 | 15
(China) Wang X.X.–Zhu Lingdi | 19 | 24 | 17
(New Zealand) MacDonald–Zeimann | 22 | 21
(Australia) Bettenay–Stevens | 20 | 10
(Australia) Johnson–Fleming | 16 | 21 | 12
(Thailand) Naraphornrapat–Worapeerachayakorn | 21 | 19 | 15

Quarterfinals; 25 June
(China) M.M. Lin–J.J. Zeng | 17 | 16
(China) Aheidan–J.Zh. Wang | 21 | 21
(China) X.Y. Xia–Xue | 21 | 18 | 15
(China) J. Dong–Wang | 16 | 21 | 5
(Japan) Ishii–Mizoe | 21 | 21
(China) Wang X.X.–Zhu Lingdi | 16 | 14
(New Zealand) MacDonald–Zeimann | 9 | 21 | 8
(Thailand) Naraphornrapat–Worapeerachayakorn | 21 | 19 | 15

Semifinals; 25 June
(China) Aheidan–J.Zh. Wang | 10 | 9
(China) X.Y. Xia–Xue | 21 | 21
(Japan) Ishii–Mizoe | 18 | 16
(Thailand) Naraphornrapat–Worapeerachayakorn | 21 | 21

Final; 26 June
(China) X.Y. Xia–Xue | 21 | 21
(Thailand) Naraphornrapat–Worapeerachayakorn | 17 | 18
3rd place
(China) Aheidan–J.Zh. Wang | 21 | 21
(Japan) Ishii–Mizoe | 18 | 19
