= Beach volleyball at the 2026 Asian Beach Games =

Sport competition

- Venue: Tianya Haijiao
- Dates: 23–29 April 2026

Beach volleyball competition at the 2026 Asian Beach Games was held at Tianya Haijiao in Sanya, China from 23 to 29 April 2026. A total of 130 athletes from 26 nations participated.

== Medalists ==
Event	Gold	Silver	Bronze
Men	Qatar; Cherif Younousse; Ahmed Tijan	Iran; Abolhassan Khakizadeh; Amir Ali Ghalehnovi	Thailand; Netitorn Muneekul; Wachirawit Muadpha
Women	Thailand; Worapeerachayakorn Kongphopsarutawadee; Taravadee Naraphornrapat	Japan; Ren Matsumoto; Non Matsumoto	China; Jiang Kaiyue; Dong Jie

== Medal table ==
Rank	Nation	Gold	Silver	Bronze	Total
1	Thailand (THA)	1	0	1	2
2	Qatar (QAT)	1	0	0	1
3	Iran (IRI)	0	1	0	1
3	Japan (JPN)	0	1	0	1
5	China (CHN)	0	0	1	1
Totals (5 entries)		2	2	2	6

== Results ==
=== Men ===
==== Preliminary phase ====
===== Pool A =====
Pos	Team	Pld	W	L	Pts	SW	SL	SR	SPW	SPL	SPR
1	Wang–Wu (CHN)	3	3	0	6	6	0	MAX	126	78	1.615
2	Al-Keer–Zaki (QAT)	3	2	1	5	4	2	2.000	120	89	1.348
3	Mahfouz–Al-Jorfi (KSA)	3	1	2	4	2	4	0.500	98	113	0.867
4	Tai–Tam (MAC)	3	0	3	3	0	6	0.000	62	126	0.492

Source: OCA

Date		Score		Set 1	Set 2	Set 3
23 Apr	Wang–Wu (CHN)	2–0	Tai–Tam (MAC)	21–9	21–9	
23 Apr	Al-Keer–Zaki (QAT)	2–0	Mahfouz–Al-Jorfi (KSA)	21–17	21–15	
24 Apr	Wang–Wu (CHN)	2–0	Mahfouz–Al-Jorfi (KSA)	21–12	21–12	
24 Apr	Al-Keer–Zaki (QAT)	2–0	Tai–Tam (MAC)	21–10	21–5	
25 Apr	Wang–Wu (CHN)	2–0	Al-Keer–Zaki (QAT)	21–19	21–17	
25 Apr	Mahfouz–Al-Jorfi (KSA)	2–0	Tai–Tam (MAC)	21–12	21–17	

===== Pool B =====
Pos	Team	Pld	W	L	Pts	SW	SL	SR	SPW	SPL	SPR
1	Younousse–Tijan (QAT)	3	3	0	6	6	1	6.000	141	93	1.516
2	Khakizadeh–Ghalehnovi (IRI)	3	2	1	5	5	2	2.500	128	116	1.103
3	Dauilbaev–Tolibaev (UZB)	3	1	2	4	2	4	0.500	99	118	0.839
4	Sajid–Naseem (MDV)	3	0	3	3	0	6	0.000	85	126	0.675

Source: OCA

Date		Score		Set 1	Set 2	Set 3
23 Apr	Younousse–Tijan (QAT)	2–0	Sajid–Naseem (MDV)	21–16	21–10	
23 Apr	Khakizadeh–Ghalehnovi (IRI)	2–0	Dauilbaev–Tolibaev (UZB)	21–16	21–18	
24 Apr	Younousse–Tijan (QAT)	2–0	Dauilbaev–Tolibaev (UZB)	21–14	21–9	
24 Apr	Khakizadeh–Ghalehnovi (IRI)	2–0	Sajid–Naseem (MDV)	21–15	21–10	
25 Apr	Younousse–Tijan (QAT)	2–1	Khakizadeh–Ghalehnovi (IRI)	21–11	21–23	15–10
25 Apr	Dauilbaev–Tolibaev (UZB)	2–0	Sajid–Naseem (MDV)	21–18	21–16	

===== Pool C =====
Pos	Team	Pld	W	L	Pts	SW	SL	SR	SPW	SPL	SPR
1	Akbar–Efendi (INA)	3	3	0	6	6	0	MAX	84	49	1.714
2	Al-Khawaher–Mahfouz (KSA)	3	2	1	5	4	2	2.000	111	75	1.480
3	Xavier–Velante (TLS)	3	1	2	4	2	4	0.500	79	113	0.699
4	Ahmed–Al-Mawid (PLE)	3	0	3	3	0	6	0.000	47	126	0.373

Source: OCA

Date		Score		Set 1	Set 2	Set 3
23 Apr	Akbar–Efendi (INA)	2–0	Xavier–Velante (TLS)	21–14	21–8	
23 Apr	Al-Khawaher–Mahfouz (KSA)	2–0	Ahmed–Al-Mawid (PLE)	21–9	21–9	
24 Apr	Akbar–Efendi (INA)	2–0	Ahmed–Al-Mawid (PLE)	Walkover		
24 Apr	Al-Khawaher–Mahfouz (KSA)	2–0	Xavier–Velante (TLS)	21–7	21–8	
25 Apr	Akbar–Efendi (INA)	2–0	Al-Khawaher–Mahfouz (KSA)	21–12	21–15	
25 Apr	Ahmed–Al-Mawid (PLE)	0–2	Xavier–Velante (TLS)	12–21	17–21	

===== Pool D =====
Pos	Team	Pld	W	L	Pts	SW	SL	SR	SPW	SPL	SPR
1	Al-Jalbubi–Al-Hashmi (OMA)	3	3	0	6	6	0	MAX	126	70	1.800
2	Kurokawa–Ikeda (JPN)	3	2	1	5	4	2	2.000	115	86	1.337
3	Phommachan–Chanthongdeng (LAO)	3	1	2	4	2	4	0.500	87	117	0.744
4	Mohamed–Hassan (MDV)	3	0	3	3	0	6	0.000	71	126	0.563

Source: OCA

Date		Score		Set 1	Set 2	Set 3
23 Apr	Kurokawa–Ikeda (JPN)	2–0	Mohamed–Hassan (MDV)	21–6	21–12	
23 Apr	Al-Jalbubi–Al-Hashmi (OMA)	2–0	Phommachan–Chanthongdeng (LAO)	21–10	21–9	
24 Apr	Kurokawa–Ikeda (JPN)	2–0	Phommachan–Chanthongdeng (LAO)	21–12	21–14	
24 Apr	Al-Jalbubi–Al-Hashmi (OMA)	2–0	Mohamed–Hassan (MDV)	21–11	21–9	
25 Apr	Kurokawa–Ikeda (JPN)	0–2	Al-Jalbubi–Al-Hashmi (OMA)	17–21	14–21	
25 Apr	Phommachan–Chanthongdeng (LAO)	2–0	Mohamed–Hassan (MDV)	21–17	21–16	

===== Pool E =====
Pos	Team	Pld	W	L	Pts	SW	SL	SR	SPW	SPL	SPR
1	Muneekul–Muadpha (THA)	3	3	0	6	6	1	6.000	140	105	1.333
2	El-Chabib–Abi Karam (LBN)	3	2	1	5	5	2	2.500	128	106	1.208
3	Faisal–Bayhaqly (INA)	3	1	2	4	2	4	0.500	111	116	0.957
4	Oh–Bae (KOR)	3	0	3	3	0	6	0.000	73	126	0.579

Source: OCA

Date		Score		Set 1	Set 2	Set 3
23 Apr	Muneekul–Muadpha (THA)	2–0	Oh–Bae (KOR)	21–9	21–14	
23 Apr	El-Chabib–Abi Karam (LBN)	2–0	Faisal–Bayhaqly (INA)	21–16	20–16^{Ret}	
24 Apr	Muneekul–Muadpha (THA)	2–0	Faisal–Bayhaqly (INA)	21–13	26–24	
24 Apr	El-Chabib–Abi Karam (LBN)	2–0	Oh–Bae (KOR)	21–8	21–15	
25 Apr	Muneekul–Muadpha (THA)	2–1	El-Chabib–Abi Karam (LBN)	21–17	15–21	15–7
25 Apr	Faisal–Bayhaqly (INA)	2–0	Oh–Bae (KOR)	21–16	21–11	

===== Pool F =====
Pos	Team	Pld	W	L	Pts	SW	SL	SR	SPW	SPL	SPR
1	Nakprakhong–Taovato (THA)	4	4	0	8	8	0	MAX	126	61	2.066
2	Yakovlev–Mokhammad (KAZ)	4	3	1	7	6	2	3.000	112	93	1.204
3	Ismail–Tan (MAS)	4	2	2	6	4	4	1.000	86	125	0.688
4	Bae–Yeo (KOR)	4	1	3	5	2	6	0.333	84	129	0.651
5	Zagal–Shijir-Erdene (MGL)	4	0	4	0	0	8	0.000	0	168	0.000

Source: OCA

Date		Score		Set 1	Set 2	Set 3
23 Apr	Yakovlev–Mokhammad (KAZ)	2–0	Bae–Yeo (KOR)	21–13	21–13	
23 Apr	Nakprakhong–Taovato (THA)	2–0	Ismail–Tan (MAS)	21–6	21–10	
23 Apr	Ismail–Tan (MAS)	2–0	Zagal–Shijir-Erdene (MGL)	Walkover		
23 Apr	Nakprakhong–Taovato (THA)	2–0	Bae–Yeo (KOR)	21–5	21–12	
24 Apr	Yakovlev–Mokhammad (KAZ)	2–0	Ismail–Tan (MAS)	21–12	21–13	
24 Apr	Nakprakhong–Taovato (THA)	2–0	Zagal–Shijir-Erdene (MGL)	Walkover		
24 Apr	Nakprakhong–Taovato (THA)	2–0	Yakovlev–Mokhammad (KAZ)	21–16	21–12	
24 Apr	Bae–Yeo (KOR)	2–0	Zagal–Shijir-Erdene (MGL)	Walkover		
25 Apr	Bae–Yeo (KOR)	0–2	Ismail–Tan (MAS)	20–22	21–23	
25 Apr	Yakovlev–Mokhammad (KAZ)	2–0	Zagal–Shijir-Erdene (MGL)	Walkover		

===== Pool G =====
Pos	Team	Pld	W	L	Pts	SW	SL	SR	SPW	SPL	SPR
1	Pourasgari–Aghajani (IRI)	4	4	0	8	8	0	MAX	168	96	1.750
2	Zhang–Zhou (CHN)	4	3	1	7	6	2	3.000	161	118	1.364
3	Sandeepana–Madusanka (SRI)	4	2	2	6	4	4	1.000	98	115	0.852
4	Rangdal–Dorji (BHU)	4	0	4	4	1	8	0.125	113	175	0.646
5	Al-Sakka–Al-Birini (SYR)	4	1	3	4	2	7	0.286	90	168	0.536

Source: OCA

Date		Score		Set 1	Set 2	Set 3
23 Apr	Pourasgari–Aghajani (IRI)	2–0	Sandeepana–Madusanka (SRI)	21–12	21–15	
23 Apr	Zhang–Zhou (CHN)	2–0	Rangdal–Dorji (BHU)	21–12	21–11	
23 Apr	Rangdal–Dorji (BHU)	1–2	Al-Sakka–Al-Birini (SYR)	21–13	12–21	9–15
23 Apr	Zhang–Zhou (CHN)	2–0	Sandeepana–Madusanka (SRI)	21–12	21–17	
24 Apr	Pourasgari–Aghajani (IRI)	2–0	Rangdal–Dorji (BHU)	21–8	21–9	
24 Apr	Zhang–Zhou (CHN)	2–0	Al-Sakka–Al-Birini (SYR)	21–11	21–13	
24 Apr	Sandeepana–Madusanka (SRI)	2–0	Al-Sakka–Al-Birini (SYR)	Walkover		
24 Apr	Zhang–Zhou (CHN)	0–2	Pourasgari–Aghajani (IRI)	18–21	17–21	
25 Apr	Pourasgari–Aghajani (IRI)	2–0	Al-Sakka–Al-Birini (SYR)	21–8	21–9	
25 Apr	Sandeepana–Madusanka (SRI)	2–0	Rangdal–Dorji (BHU)	21–15	21–16	

===== Pool H =====
Pos	Team	Pld	W	L	Pts	SW	SL	SR	SPW	SPL	SPR
1	Bogatu–Gurin (KAZ)	4	4	0	8	8	1	8.000	182	132	1.379
2	Fukushima–Malki (JPN)	4	3	1	7	7	2	3.500	179	115	1.557
3	Thushara–Pushpakumara (SRI)	4	2	2	6	4	4	1.000	144	143	1.007
4	Biswas–Ahmed (BAN)	4	1	3	5	2	6	0.333	131	144	0.910
5	Kounlavong–Xayyakhom (LAO)	4	0	4	4	0	8	0.000	66	168	0.393

Source: OCA

Date		Score		Set 1	Set 2	Set 3
23 Apr	Bogatu–Gurin (KAZ)	2–0	Kounlavong–Xayyakhom (LAO)	21–11	21–5	
23 Apr	Fukushima–Malki (JPN)	2–0	Thushara–Pushpakumara (SRI)	21–13	21–13	
23 Apr	Kounlavong–Xayyakhom (LAO)	0–2	Biswas–Ahmed (BAN)	9–21	9–21	
23 Apr	Bogatu–Gurin (KAZ)	2–0	Thushara–Pushpakumara (SRI)	21–19	21–15	
24 Apr	Fukushima–Malki (JPN)	2–0	Kounlavong–Xayyakhom (LAO)	21–4	21–6	
24 Apr	Bogatu–Gurin (KAZ)	2–0	Biswas–Ahmed (BAN)	21–15	21–14	
24 Apr	Thushara–Pushpakumara (SRI)	2–0	Biswas–Ahmed (BAN)	21–18	21–19	
24 Apr	Bogatu–Gurin (KAZ)	2–1	Fukushima–Malki (JPN)	18–21	23–21	15–11
25 Apr	Fukushima–Malki (JPN)	2–0	Biswas–Ahmed (BAN)	21–11	21–12	
25 Apr	Thushara–Pushpakumara (SRI)	2–0	Kounlavong–Xayyakhom (LAO)	21–10	21–12	

==== Knockout phase ====
Round of 16; 26 April
Wang–Wu (CHN)	18	15
Khakizadeh–Ghalehnovi (IRI)	21	21
El-Chabib–Abi Karam (LBN)	24	18	15
Bogatu–Gurin (KAZ)	22	21	13
Pourasgari–Aghajani (IRI)	21	21
Kurokawa–Ikeda (JPN)	15	17
Yakovlev–Mokhammad (KAZ)	15	19
Al-Jalbubi–Al-Hashmi (OMA)	21	21
Akbar–Efendi (INA)	21	21
Fukushima–Malki (JPN)	19	15
Al-Khawaher–Mahfouz (KSA)	16	16
Muneekul–Muadpha (THA)	21	21
Nakprakhong–Taovato (THA)	21	17	12
Zhang–Zhou (CHN)	18	21	15
Al-Keer–Zaki (QAT)	10	16
Younousse–Tijan (QAT)	21	21

Quarterfinals; 27 April
Khakizadeh–Ghalehnovi (IRI)	21	21
El-Chabib–Abi Karam (LBN)	10	14
Pourasgari–Aghajani (IRI)	21	17	9
Al-Jalbubi–Al-Hashmi (OMA)	14	21	15
Akbar–Efendi (INA)	13	23	14
Muneekul–Muadpha (THA)	21	21	16
Zhang–Zhou (CHN)	10	19
Younousse–Tijan (QAT)	21	21

Semifinals; 28 April
Khakizadeh–Ghalehnovi (IRI)	21	15	15
Al-Jalbubi–Al-Hashmi (OMA)	17	21	13
Muneekul–Muadpha (THA)	12	14
Younousse–Tijan (QAT)	21	21

Gold medal 29 April
Khakizadeh–Ghalehnovi (IRI)	15	12
Younousse–Tijan (QAT)	21	21
Bronze medal
Al-Jalbubi–Al-Hashmi (OMA)	18	15
Muneekul–Muadpha (THA)	21	21

=== Women ===
==== Preliminary phase ====
===== Pool A =====
Pos	Team	Pld	W	L	Pts	SW	SL	SR	SPW	SPL	SPR
1	Jiang–Dong (CHN)	2	2	0	4	4	0	MAX	84	20	4.200
2	Ashanga–Tharuka (SRI)	2	1	1	3	2	2	1.000	51	53	0.962
3	Abuissa–Bahmanzadeh (QAT)	2	0	2	2	0	4	0.000	22	84	0.262

Source: OCA

Date		Score		Set 1	Set 2	Set 3
23 Apr	Jiang–Dong (CHN)	2–0	Ashanga–Tharuka (SRI)	21–4	21–5	
24 Apr	Abuissa–Bahmanzadeh (QAT)	0–2	Ashanga–Tharuka (SRI)	6–21	5–21	
25 Apr	Jiang–Dong (CHN)	2–0	Abuissa–Bahmanzadeh (QAT)	21–8	21–3	

===== Pool B =====
Pos	Team	Pld	W	L	Pts	SW	SL	SR	SPW	SPL	SPR
1	Matsumoto–Matsumoto (JPN)	2	2	0	4	4	0	MAX	84	25	3.360
2	Seo–Kim (KOR)	2	1	1	3	2	2	1.000	58	64	0.906
3	Hashim–Shalaby (QAT)	2	0	2	2	0	4	0.000	31	84	0.369

Source: OCA

Date		Score		Set 1	Set 2	Set 3
23 Apr	Matsumoto–Matsumoto (JPN)	2–0	Hashim–Shalaby (QAT)	21–5	21–4	
24 Apr	Seo–Kim (KOR)	2–0	Hashim–Shalaby (QAT)	21–13	21–9	
25 Apr	Matsumoto–Matsumoto (JPN)	2–0	Seo–Kim (KOR)	21–5	21–11	

===== Pool C =====
Pos	Team	Pld	W	L	Pts	SW	SL	SR	SPW	SPL	SPR
1	Kadeliye–Zhou (CHN)	2	2	0	4	4	0	MAX	84	45	1.867
2	Mamatzhan Kyzy–Kudaikulova (KGZ)	2	1	1	3	2	2	1.000	65	79	0.823
3	Shin–Kim (KOR)	2	0	2	2	0	4	0.000	59	84	0.702

Source: OCA

Date		Score		Set 1	Set 2	Set 3
23 Apr	Kadeliye–Zhou (CHN)	2–0	Mamatzhan Kyzy–Kudaikulova (KGZ)	21–12	21–11	
24 Apr	Shin–Kim (KOR)	0–2	Mamatzhan Kyzy–Kudaikulova (KGZ)	19–21	18–21	
25 Apr	Kadeliye–Zhou (CHN)	2–0	Shin–Kim (KOR)	21–11	21–11	

===== Pool D =====
Pos	Team	Pld	W	L	Pts	SW	SL	SR	SPW	SPL	SPR
1	Kongphopsarutawadee–Naraphornrapat (THA)	2	2	0	4	4	0	MAX	84	47	1.787
2	Kung–Yeh (TPE)	2	1	1	3	2	2	1.000	70	73	0.959
3	Cheikho–Al-Nahi (LBN)	2	0	2	2	0	4	0.000	51	85	0.600

Source: OCA

Date		Score		Set 1	Set 2	Set 3
23 Apr	Kongphopsarutawadee–Naraphornrapat (THA)	2–0	Kung–Yeh (TPE)	21–13	21–14	
24 Apr	Cheikho–Al-Nahi (LBN)	0–2	Kung–Yeh (TPE)	11–21	20–22	
25 Apr	Kongphopsarutawadee–Naraphornrapat (THA)	2–0	Cheikho–Al-Nahi (LBN)	21–10	21–10	

===== Pool E =====
Pos	Team	Pld	W	L	Pts	SW	SL	SR	SPW	SPL	SPR
1	Ito–Ishii (JPN)	3	3	0	6	6	0	MAX	126	40	3.150
2	Sin–Goh (MAS)	3	2	1	5	4	2	2.000	96	81	1.185
3	Areesha–Anaal (MDV)	3	1	2	4	2	4	0.500	78	109	0.716
4	Al-Shaikh–Moussa (SYR)	3	0	3	3	0	6	0.000	56	126	0.444

Source: OCA

Date		Score		Set 1	Set 2	Set 3
23 Apr	Ito–Ishii (JPN)	2–0	Areesha–Anaal (MDV)	21–9	21–8	
23 Apr	Sin–Goh (MAS)	2–0	Al-Shaikh–Moussa (SYR)	21–14	21–6	
24 Apr	Ito–Ishii (JPN)	2–0	Al-Shaikh–Moussa (SYR)	21–8	21–3	
24 Apr	Sin–Goh (MAS)	2–0	Areesha–Anaal (MDV)	21–11	21–8	
25 Apr	Ito–Ishii (JPN)	2–0	Sin–Goh (MAS)	21–7	21–5	
25 Apr	Al-Shaikh–Moussa (SYR)	0–2	Areesha–Anaal (MDV)	10–21	15–21	

===== Pool F =====
Pos	Team	Pld	W	L	Pts	SW	SL	SR	SPW	SPL	SPR
1	Mungkhon–Seehawong (THA)	3	3	0	6	6	0	MAX	126	55	2.291
2	Sari–Kaize (INA)	3	2	1	5	4	2	2.000	114	68	1.676
3	Khatun–Akter (BAN)	3	1	2	4	2	4	0.500	75	118	0.636
4	Rishfa–Ishag (MDV)	3	0	3	3	0	6	0.000	52	126	0.413

Source: OCA

Date		Score		Set 1	Set 2	Set 3
23 Apr	Mungkhon–Seehawong (THA)	2–0	Khatun–Akter (BAN)	21–9	21–5	
23 Apr	Sari–Kaize (INA)	2–0	Rishfa–Ishag (MDV)	21–1	21–6	
24 Apr	Mungkhon–Seehawong (THA)	2–0	Rishfa–Ishag (MDV)	21–5	21–6	
24 Apr	Sari–Kaize (INA)	2–0	Khatun–Akter (BAN)	21–4	21–15	
25 Apr	Mungkhon–Seehawong (THA)	2–0	Sari–Kaize (INA)	21–18	21–12	
25 Apr	Rishfa–Ishag (MDV)	0–2	Khatun–Akter (BAN)	15–21	19–21	

===== Pool G =====
Pos	Team	Pld	W	L	Pts	SW	SL	SR	SPW	SPL	SPR
1	Progella–Pagara (PHI)	3	3	0	6	6	0	MAX	127	75	1.693
2	Leong–Law (MAC)	3	2	1	5	4	2	2.000	112	87	1.287
3	Kabulbekova–Ivanchenko (KAZ)	3	1	2	4	2	4	0.500	102	97	1.052
4	Kurbanova–Muzaffarova (UZB)	3	0	3	3	0	6	0.000	44	126	0.349

Source: OCA

Date		Score		Set 1	Set 2	Set 3
23 Apr	Kabulbekova–Ivanchenko (KAZ)	2–0	Kurbanova–Muzaffarova (UZB)	21–6	21–6	
23 Apr	Progella–Pagara (PHI)	2–0	Leong–Law (MAC)	21–19	21–9	
24 Apr	Kabulbekova–Ivanchenko (KAZ)	0–2	Leong–Law (MAC)	9–21	14–21	
24 Apr	Progella–Pagara (PHI)	2–0	Kurbanova–Muzaffarova (UZB)	21–7	21–3	
25 Apr	Kabulbekova–Ivanchenko (KAZ)	0–2	Progella–Pagara (PHI)	17–21	20–22	
25 Apr	Leong–Law (MAC)	2–0	Kurbanova–Muzaffarova (UZB)	21–7	21–15	

===== Pool H =====
Pos	Team	Pld	W	L	Pts	SW	SL	SR	SPW	SPL	SPR
1	Villapando–Matibag (PHI)	3	3	0	6	6	0	MAX	126	66	1.909
2	Karimova–Ryukhova (KAZ)	3	2	1	5	4	2	2.000	100	81	1.235
3	Lam–Ian (MAC)	3	1	2	4	2	4	0.500	95	109	0.872
4	Oyuuntuyaa–Khandsüren (MGL)	3	0	3	3	0	6	0.000	61	126	0.484

Source: OCA

Date		Score		Set 1	Set 2	Set 3
23 Apr	Karimova–Ryukhova (KAZ)	2–0	Oyuuntuyaa–Khandsüren (MGL)	21–7	21–8	
23 Apr	Villapando–Matibag (PHI)	2–0	Lam–Ian (MAC)	21–19	21–10	
24 Apr	Karimova–Ryukhova (KAZ)	2–0	Lam–Ian (MAC)	21–14	21–10	
24 Apr	Villapando–Matibag (PHI)	2–0	Oyuuntuyaa–Khandsüren (MGL)	21–10	21–11	
25 Apr	Karimova–Ryukhova (KAZ)	0–2	Villapando–Matibag (PHI)	8–21	8–21	
25 Apr	Lam–Ian (MAC)	2–0	Oyuuntuyaa–Khandsüren (MGL)	21–15	21–10	

==== Knockout phase ====
Round of 16; 26 April
Jiang–Dong (CHN)	21	21
Sari–Kaize (INA)	11	9
Kung–Yeh (TPE)	10	5
Ito–Ishii (JPN)	21	21
Progella–Pagara (PHI)	21	21
Karimova–Ryukhova (KAZ)	11	14
Seo–Kim (KOR)	7	6
Kongphopsarutawadee–Naraphornrapat (THA)	21	21
Kadeliye–Zhou (CHN)	21	21
Leong–Law (MAC)	11	11
Mamatzhan Kyzy–Kudaikulova (KGZ)	11	9
Mungkhon–Seehawong (THA)	21	21
Villapando–Matibag (PHI)	21	21
Ashanga–Tharuka (SRI)	15	13
Sin–Goh (MAS)	7	14
Matsumoto–Matsumoto (JPN)	21	21

Quarterfinals; 27 April
Jiang–Dong (CHN)	28	21
Ito–Ishii (JPN)	26	17
Progella–Pagara (PHI)	17	15
Kongphopsarutawadee–Naraphornrapat (THA)	21	21
Kadeliye–Zhou (CHN)	21	17	11
Mungkhon–Seehawong (THA)	15	21	15
Villapando–Matibag (PHI)	10	13
Matsumoto–Matsumoto (JPN)	21	21

Semifinals; 28 April
Jiang–Dong (CHN)	21	16	11
Kongphopsarutawadee–Naraphornrapat (THA)	19	21	15
Mungkhon–Seehawong (THA)	14	13
Matsumoto–Matsumoto (JPN)	21	21

Gold medal 29 April
Kongphopsarutawadee–Naraphornrapat (THA)	21	21
Matsumoto–Matsumoto (JPN)	17	15
Bronze medal
Jiang–Dong (CHN)	21	18	15
Mungkhon–Seehawong (THA)	14	21	13
