= Beach volleyball at the 2022 Asian Games – Women's tournament =

Women at the 2022 Asian Games
- Venue: Banbianshan Beach
- Dates: 19–27 September 2023
- Competitors: 40 from 11 nations

Medalists
gold medal	Xue Chen; Xia Xinyi	China
silver medal	Sayaka Mizoe; Miki Ishii	Japan
bronze medal	Wang Fan; Dong Jie	China

The women's beach volleyball tournament at the 2022 Asian Games took place at the Banxiangshan Beach Volleyball Centre, Ningbo, China from 19 to 27 September 2023.

== Schedule ==
All times are China Standard Time (UTC+08:00)

Date	Time	Event
Tuesday, 19 September 2023	11:00	Preliminary round
Wednesday, 20 September 2023	11:00	Preliminary round
Thursday, 21 September 2023	11:00	Preliminary round
Friday, 22 September 2023	11:00	Preliminary round
Sunday, 24 September 2023	09:00	Round of 16
Monday, 25 September 2023	10:00	Quarterfinals
Tuesday, 26 September 2023	14:00	Semifinals
Wednesday, 27 September 2023	14:00	Bronze medal match
Wednesday, 27 September 2023	15:00	Gold medal match

== Results ==
Legend

- Ret — Retired

=== Preliminary round ===
==== Pool A ====
Pos	Team	Pld	W	L	Pts	SW	SL	SR	SPW	SPL	SPR	Qualification
1	Xue–Xia (CHN)	4	4	0	8	8	0	MAX	168	57	2.947	Round of 16
2	Rodriguez–Eslapor (PHI)	4	3	1	7	6	2	3.000	142	111	1.279	Round of 16
3	Kabulbekova–Ivanchenko (KAZ)	4	2	2	6	4	5	0.800	130	156	0.833	Round of 16
4	Bandara–Weerasinghe (SRI)	4	1	3	5	3	6	0.500	127	167	0.760	Round of 16
5	Shin–Kim (KOR)	4	0	4	4	0	8	0.000	96	172	0.558	

Source: OCA

Date		Score		Set 1	Set 2	Set 3
19 Sep	Xue–Xia (CHN)	2–0	Bandara–Weerasinghe (SRI)	21–5	21–8	
19 Sep	Rodriguez–Eslapor (PHI)	2–0	Shin–Kim (KOR)	21–11	21–6	
19 Sep	Kabulbekova–Ivanchenko (KAZ)	2–1	Bandara–Weerasinghe (SRI)	21–12	12–21	15–8
20 Sep	Shin–Kim (KOR)	0–2	Kabulbekova–Ivanchenko (KAZ)	18–21	13–21	
20 Sep	Xue–Xia (CHN)	2–0	Rodriguez–Eslapor (PHI)	21–11	21–5	
20 Sep	Rodriguez–Eslapor (PHI)	2–0	Kabulbekova–Ivanchenko (KAZ)	21–11	21–14	
21 Sep	Kabulbekova–Ivanchenko (KAZ)	0–2	Xue–Xia (CHN)	10–21	5–21	
21 Sep	Bandara–Weerasinghe (SRI)	2–0	Shin–Kim (KOR)	25–23	21–12	
22 Sep	Shin–Kim (KOR)	0–2	Xue–Xia (CHN)	8–21	5–21	
22 Sep	Bandara–Weerasinghe (SRI)	0–2	Rodriguez–Eslapor (PHI)	10–21	17–21	

==== Pool B ====
Pos	Team	Pld	W	L	Pts	SW	SL	SR	SPW	SPL	SPR	Qualification
1	Naraphornrapat–Kongphopsarutawadee (THA)	4	4	0	8	8	0	MAX	168	83	2.024	Round of 16
2	Juliana–Ratnasari (INA)	4	3	1	7	6	2	3.000	159	97	1.639	Round of 16
3	Progella–Matibag (PHI)	4	2	2	6	4	5	0.800	121	172	0.703	Round of 16
4	Wong–To (HKG)	4	1	3	5	3	6	0.500	146	164	0.890	Round of 16
5	Tam–Lei (MAC)	4	0	4	4	0	8	0.000	90	168	0.536	

Source: OCA

Date		Score		Set 1	Set 2	Set 3
19 Sep	Wong–To (HKG)	1–2	Progella–Matibag (PHI)	21–17	21–23	13–15
19 Sep	Naraphornrapat–Kongphopsarutawadee (THA)	2–0	Tam–Lei (MAC)	21–8	21–10	
19 Sep	Juliana–Ratnasari (INA)	2–0	Tam–Lei (MAC)	21–9	21–5	
20 Sep	Progella–Matibag (PHI)	0–2	Juliana–Ratnasari (INA)	14–21	10–21	
20 Sep	Naraphornrapat–Kongphopsarutawadee (THA)	2–0	Wong–To (HKG)	21–15	21–17	
20 Sep	Wong–To (HKG)	0–2	Juliana–Ratnasari (INA)	9–21	8–21	
21 Sep	Juliana–Ratnasari (INA)	0–2	Naraphornrapat–Kongphopsarutawadee (THA)	18–21	15–21	
21 Sep	Tam–Lei (MAC)	0–2	Progella–Matibag (PHI)	18–21	15–21	
22 Sep	Tam–Lei (MAC)	0–2	Wong–To (HKG)	14–21	11–21	
22 Sep	Progella–Matibag (PHI)	0–2	Naraphornrapat–Kongphopsarutawadee (THA)	Walkover		

==== Pool C ====
Pos	Team	Pld	W	L	Pts	SW	SL	SR	SPW	SPL	SPR	Qualification
1	Mizoe–Ishii (JPN)	4	4	0	8	8	0	MAX	168	80	2.100	Round of 16
2	Phirachayankrailert–Patcharamainaruebhorn (THA)	4	3	1	7	6	3	2.000	168	152	1.105	Round of 16
3	Law–Leong (MAC)	4	2	2	6	4	4	1.000	138	145	0.952	Round of 16
4	Yuen–Lo (HKG)	4	1	3	5	3	6	0.500	141	156	0.904	Round of 16
5	Lee–Jeon (KOR)	4	0	4	4	0	8	0.000	86	168	0.512	

Source: OCA

Date		Score		Set 1	Set 2	Set 3
19 Sep	Phirachayankrailert–Patcharamainaruebhorn (THA)	2–0	Lee–Jeon (KOR)	21–15	21–11	
19 Sep	Yuen–Lo (HKG)	0–2	Law–Leong (MAC)	16–21	15–21	
20 Sep	Mizoe–Ishii (JPN)	2–0	Phirachayankrailert–Patcharamainaruebhorn (THA)	21–11	21–14	
20 Sep	Lee–Jeon (KOR)	0–2	Yuen–Lo (HKG)	7–21	11–21	
21 Sep	Yuen–Lo (HKG)	0–2	Mizoe–Ishii (JPN)	8–21	11–21	
21 Sep	Law–Leong (MAC)	2–0	Lee–Jeon (KOR)	21–14	21–11	
21 Sep	Mizoe–Ishii (JPN)	2–0	Law–Leong (MAC)	21–7	21–12	
22 Sep	Law–Leong (MAC)	0–2	Phirachayankrailert–Patcharamainaruebhorn (THA)	11–21	24–26	
22 Sep	Phirachayankrailert–Patcharamainaruebhorn (THA)	2–1	Yuen–Lo (HKG)	21–17	18–21	15–11
22 Sep	Lee–Jeon (KOR)	0–2	Mizoe–Ishii (JPN)	6–21	11–21	

==== Pool D ====
Pos	Team	Pld	W	L	Pts	SW	SL	SR	SPW	SPL	SPR	Qualification
1	Wang–Dong (CHN)	4	4	0	8	8	0	MAX	168	89	1.888	Round of 16
2	Hasegawa–Sakaguchi (JPN)	4	3	1	7	6	2	3.000	155	98	1.582	Round of 16
3	Sari–Herdanti (INA)	4	2	2	6	4	5	0.800	141	148	0.953	Round of 16
4	Rachenko–Ukolova (KAZ)	4	1	3	5	3	6	0.500	131	140	0.936	Round of 16
5	Badalbekova–Khurshedodova (TJK)	4	0	4	4	0	8	0.000	48	168	0.286	

Source: OCA

Date		Score		Set 1	Set 2	Set 3
19 Sep	Wang–Dong (CHN)	2–0	Badalbekova–Khurshedodova (TJK)	21–9	21–7	
19 Sep	Rachenko–Ukolova (KAZ)	1–2	Sari–Herdanti (INA)	21–12	16–21	13–15
20 Sep	Badalbekova–Khurshedodova (TJK)	0–2	Rachenko–Ukolova (KAZ)	6–21	2^{Ret}–9	
20 Sep	Hasegawa–Sakaguchi (JPN)	0–2	Wang–Dong (CHN)	17–21	12–21	
21 Sep	Rachenko–Ukolova (KAZ)	0–2	Hasegawa–Sakaguchi (JPN)	9–21	11–21	
21 Sep	Sari–Herdanti (INA)	2–0	Badalbekova–Khurshedodova (TJK)	21–8	21–6	
21 Sep	Hasegawa–Sakaguchi (JPN)	2–0	Sari–Herdanti (INA)	21–8	21–18	
22 Sep	Wang–Dong (CHN)	2–0	Rachenko–Ukolova (KAZ)	21–8	21–11	
22 Sep	Badalbekova–Khurshedodova (TJK)	0–2	Hasegawa–Sakaguchi (JPN)	6–21	4–21	
22 Sep	Sari–Herdanti (INA)	0–2	Wang–Dong (CHN)	13–21	12–21	

=== Knockout round ===
Round of 16
Xue–Xia (CHN)	21	21
Yuen–Lo (HKG)	11	7
Kabulbekova–Ivanchenko (KAZ)	7	12
Hasegawa–Sakaguchi (JPN)	21	21
Juliana–Ratnasari (INA)	21	21
Sari–Herdanti (INA)	14	11
Wong–To (HKG)	13	7
Wang–Dong (CHN)	21	21
Mizoe–Ishii (JPN)	21	21
Rachenko–Ukolova (KAZ)	8	7
Law–Leong (MAC)	15	15
Rodriguez–Eslapor (PHI)	21	21
Phirachayankrailert–Patcharamainaruebhorn (THA)	21	25
Progella–Matibag (PHI)	16	23
Bandara–Weerasinghe (SRI)	10	10
Naraphornrapat–Kongphopsarutawadee (THA)	21	21

Quarterfinals
Xue–Xia (CHN)	21	21
Hasegawa–Sakaguchi (JPN)	16	12
Juliana–Ratnasari (INA)	11	11
Wang–Dong (CHN)	21	21
Mizoe–Ishii (JPN)	21	21
Rodriguez–Eslapor (PHI)	16	11
Phirachayankrailert–Patcharamainaruebhorn (THA)	14	7
Naraphornrapat–Kongphopsarutawadee (THA)	21	21

Semifinals
Xue–Xia (CHN)	23	21
Wang–Dong (CHN)	21	16
Mizoe–Ishii (JPN)	16	21	15
Naraphornrapat–Kongphopsarutawadee (THA)	21	14	13

Gold medal match
Xue–Xia (CHN)	21	21
Mizoe–Ishii (JPN)	11	13
Bronze medal match
Wang–Dong (CHN)	21	21
Naraphornrapat–Kongphopsarutawadee (THA)	15	19

== Final standing ==
Rank	Team	Pld	W	L
1st place, gold medalist(s)	Xue Chen – Xia Xinyi (CHN)	8	8	0
2nd place, silver medalist(s)	Sayaka Mizoe – Miki Ishii (JPN)	8	7	1
3rd place, bronze medalist(s)	Wang Fan – Dong Jie (CHN)	8	7	1
4	Taravadee Naraphornrapat – Worapeerachayakorn Kongphopsarutawadee (THA)	8	6	2
5	Dhita Juliana – Desi Ratnasari (INA)	6	4	2
5	Akiko Hasegawa – Yurika Sakaguchi (JPN)	6	4	2
5	Dij Rodriguez – Genesa Jane Eslapor (PHI)	6	4	2
5	Woranatchayakorn Phirachayakrailert – Charanrutwadee Patcharamainaruebhorn (THA)	6	4	2
9	Wong Man Ching – To Wing Tung (HKG)	5	1	4
9	Yuen Ting Chi – Lo Wai Yan (HKG)	5	1	4
9	Nur Atika Sari – Bernadetta Shella Herdanti (INA)	5	2	3
9	Laura Kabulbekova – Nadezhda Ivanchenko (KAZ)	5	2	3
9	Alina Rachenko – Anastassiya Ukolova (KAZ)	5	1	4
9	Law Weng Sam – Leong On Ieng (MAC)	5	2	3
9	Khylem Progella – Grydelle Matibag (PHI)	5	2	3
9	Deepika Bandara – Chathurika Weerasinghe (SRI)	5	1	4
17	Lee Ho-bin – Jeon Ha-ri (KOR)	4	0	4
17	Shin Ji-eun – Kim Se-yeon (KOR)	4	0	4
17	Tam Kin Teng – Lei Keng Lai (MAC)	4	0	4
17	Zamira Badalbekova – Anisa Khurshedodova (TJK)	4	0	4
