= Beach volleyball at the 2026 Asian Games =

- Venue: Hekinan Ryokuchi Beach Court
- Location: Hekinan, Aichi Prefecture, Japan
- Dates: 20 September–3 October 2026
- Competitors: 112 from 21 nations

The beach volleyball tournament at the 2026 Asian Games is being held between 20 September and 3 October 2026 at the Hekinan Ryokuchi Beach Court.

== Schedule ==
The schedule is as follows:

G	Group stage	R	Round of 16	¼	Quarterfinals	½	Semifinals	B	Bronze medal match	F	Gold medal match

Event↓/Date →	20th Sun	21st Mon	22nd Tue	23rd Wed	24th Thu	25th Fri	26th Sat	27th Sun	28th Mon	29th Tue	30th Wed	1st Thu	2nd Fri		3rd Sat	
Men	G	G	G	G	G	G	G	G	R		¼	½			B	F
Women	G	G	G	G	G	G	G	G	R	R	¼	½	B	F		

== Medal summary ==
=== Medal table ===
* Host nation (Japan)

Rank	Nation	Gold	Silver	Bronze	Total
1	Qatar	1	0	0	1
1	Thailand	1	0	0	1
3	China	0	1	0	1
3	Indonesia	0	1	0	1
5	Japan*	0	0	1	1
5	Philippines	0	0	1	1
Totals (6 entries)		2	2	2	6

=== Medalists ===
Event	Gold	Silver	Bronze
Men	Qatar; Cherif Younousse; Ahmed Tijan	Indonesia; Sofyan Rachman Efendi; Bintang Akbar	Japan; Kota Kurosawa; Taito Mizumachi
Women	Thailand; Taravadee Naraphornrapat; Worapeerachayakorn Kongphopsarutawadee	China; Xia Xinyi; Yan Xu	Philippines; Khylem Progella; Sofiah Pagara

== Participating nations ==
- Bangladesh (4)
- China (8)
- Hong Kong (8)
- Indonesia (4)
- Iran (4)
- Japan (8) (host)
- Kazakhstan (8)
- Kyrgyzstan (2)
- Macau (2)
- Malaysia (2)
- Maldives (4)
- Mongolia (6)
- Oman (4)
- Philippines (8)
- Qatar (8)
- South Korea (8)
- Sri Lanka (4)
- Thailand (8)
- Timor-Leste (2)
- Uzbekistan (2)
- Vietnam (8)
