= 2021 Asian Beach Volleyball Championships =

International beach volleyball competition

- Location: Phuket, Thailand
- Dates: 23–27 November 2021

The 2021 Asian Beach Volleyball Championship was a beach volleyball event, held in November 2021 in Phuket, Thailand. It was originally planned to be held in China in July 2020 but was postponed twice due to the COVID-19 pandemic.

== Medal summary ==
Event	Gold	Silver	Bronze
Men	Australia; Chris McHugh; Paul Burnett	Iran; Bahman Salemi; Abolhassan Khakizadeh	Qatar; Cherif Younousse; Ahmed Tijan
Women	Thailand; Taravadee Naraphornrapat; Worapeerachayakorn Kongphopsarutawadee	Japan; Miki Ishii; Sayaka Mizoe	Australia; Phoebe Bell; Georgia Johnson

== Participating nations ==
=== Men ===
- Australia (3)
- Iran (3)
- Japan (3)
- Kazakhstan (3)
- Philippines (2)
- Qatar (2)
- Singapore (1)
- Sri Lanka (2)
- Thailand (4)

=== Women ===
- Australia (3)
- Japan (3)
- Kazakhstan (2)
- New Zealand (1)
- Philippines (2)
- Singapore (2)
- Sri Lanka (2)
- Thailand (4)

== Men's tournament ==
=== Preliminary round ===
==== Pool A ====
Pos	Team	Pld	W	L	Pts	SW	SL	SR	SPW	SPL	SPR
1	N. Banlue–J. Surin	2	2	0	4	4	0	MAX	84	65	1.292
2	(Iran) S. Shekar–Aro	2	1	1	3	2	2	1.000	75	79	0.949
3	(Kazakhstan) Aldash–Petrossyants	2	0	2	2	0	4	0.000	69	84	0.821

Source: AVC

Date		Score		Set 1	Set 2	Set 3
23 Nov	N. Banlue–J. Surin	2–0	(Iran) S. Shekar–Aro	21–16	21–17	
24 Nov	N. Banlue–J. Surin	2–0	(Kazakhstan) Aldash–Petrossyants	21–16	21–16	
25 Nov	Aldash–Petrossyants (Kazakhstan)	0–2	(Iran) S. Shekar–Aro	19–21	18–21	

==== Pool B ====
Pos	Team	Pld	W	L	Pts	SW	SL	SR	SPW	SPL	SPR
1	(Qatar) Cherif–Ahmed	2	2	0	4	4	0	MAX	84	58	1.448
2	T. Poravid–T. Pithak	2	1	1	3	2	3	0.667	88	92	0.957
3	(Kazakhstan) Sidorenko–Gurin	2	0	2	2	1	4	0.250	74	96	0.771

Source: AVC

Date		Score		Set 1	Set 2	Set 3
23 Nov	Cherif–Ahmed (Qatar)	2–0	T. Poravid–T. Pithak	21–15	21–19	
24 Nov	Cherif–Ahmed (Qatar)	2–0	(Kazakhstan) Sidorenko–Gurin	21–15	21–9	
25 Nov	Aldash–Petrossyants (Kazakhstan)	1–2	T. Poravid–T. Pithak	16–21	21–18	13–15

==== Pool C ====
Pos	Team	Pld	W	L	Pts	SW	SL	SR	SPW	SPL	SPR
1	(Australia) McHugh–Burnett	2	2	0	4	4	0	MAX	84	65	1.292
2	(Philippines) Garcia–Arbasto	2	1	1	3	2	2	1.000	77	82	0.939
3	(Singapore) Tay Z.H.K.–Goh T.K.M.	2	0	2	2	0	4	0.000	75	89	0.843

Source: AVC

Date		Score		Set 1	Set 2	Set 3
23 Nov	McHugh–Burnett (Australia)	2–0	(Philippines) Garcia–Arbasto	21–17	21–13	
24 Nov	McHugh–Burnett (Australia)	2–0	(Singapore) Tay Z.H.K.–Goh T.K.M.	21–17	21–18	
25 Nov	Tay Z.H.K.–Goh T.K.M. (Singapore)	0–2	(Philippines) Garcia–Arbasto	24–26	16–21	

==== Pool D ====
Pos	Team	Pld	W	L	Pts	SW	SL	SR	SPW	SPL	SPR
1	(Kazakhstan) Bogatu–Yakovlev	2	2	0	4	4	0	MAX	84	61	1.377
2	(Japan) Hasegawa–Tsuchiya	2	1	1	3	2	2	1.000	75	76	0.987
3	(Sri Lanka) Tiron–Sandun	2	0	2	2	0	4	0.000	62	84	0.738

Source: AVC

Date		Score		Set 1	Set 2	Set 3
23 Nov	Hasegawa–Tsuchiya (Japan)	2–0	(Sri Lanka) Tiron–Sandun	21–17	21–17	
24 Nov	Hasegawa–Tsuchiya (Japan)	0–2	(Kazakhstan) Bogatu–Yakovlev	17–21	16–21	
25 Nov	Bogatu–Yakovlev (Kazakhstan)	2–0	(Sri Lanka) Tiron–Sandun	21–14	21–14	

==== Pool E ====
Pos	Team	Pld	W	L	Pts	SW	SL	SR	SPW	SPL	SPR
1	D. Kitti–T. Phanupong	2	2	0	4	4	1	4.000	92	78	1.179
2	(Australia) Carracher–Takken	2	1	1	3	3	3	1.000	100	103	0.971
3	(Japan) Takahashi–Murakami	2	0	2	2	1	4	0.250	84	95	0.884

Source: AVC

Date		Score		Set 1	Set 2	Set 3
23 Nov	Takahashi–Murakami (Japan)	1–2	(Australia) Carracher–Takken	21–17	19–21	13–15
24 Nov	Takahashi–Murakami (Japan)	0–2	D. Kitti–T. Phanupong	17–21	14–21	
25 Nov	D. Kitti–T. Phanupong	2–1	(Australia) Carracher–Takken	14–21	21–15	15–11

==== Pool F ====
Pos	Team	Pld	W	L	Pts	SW	SL	SR	SPW	SPL	SPR
1	(Australia) Guehrer–Nicolaidis	2	2	0	4	4	2	2.000	109	99	1.101
2	(Iran) Salemi B.–Abolhassan	2	1	1	3	3	2	1.500	91	84	1.083
3	(Sri Lanka) Ashen–Malintha Yapa	2	0	2	2	1	4	0.250	81	98	0.827

Source: AVC

Date		Score		Set 1	Set 2	Set 3
23 Nov	Guehrer–Nicolaidis (Australia)	2–1	(Sri Lanka) Ashen–Malintha Yapa	20–22	21–18	15–10
24 Nov	Guehrer–Nicolaidis (Australia)	2–1	(Iran) Salemi B.–Abolhassan	21–19	17–21	15–9
25 Nov	Salemi B.–Abolhassan (Iran)	2–0	(Sri Lanka) Ashen–Malintha Yapa	21–14	21–17	

==== Pool G ====
Pos	Team	Pld	W	L	Pts	SW	SL	SR	SPW	SPL	SPR
1	(Iran) A. Mirzaali–A. Aghajani	2	2	0	4	4	2	2.000	108	98	1.102
2	N. Kangkon–K. Dunwinit	2	1	1	3	3	2	1.500	94	81	1.160
3	(Philippines) Pareja–Pecaña	2	0	2	2	1	4	0.250	74	97	0.763

Source: AVC

Date		Score		Set 1	Set 2	Set 3
23 Nov	A. Mirzaali–A. Aghajani (Iran)	2–1	(Philippines) Pareja–Pecaña	19–21	21–17	15–8
24 Nov	A. Mirzaali–A. Aghajani (Iran)	2–1	N. Kangkon–K. Dunwinit	21–18	17–21	15–13
25 Nov	N. Kangkon–K. Dunwinit	2–0	(Philippines) Pareja–Pecaña	21–9	21–19	

==== Pool H ====
Pos	Team	Pld	W	L	Pts	SW	SL	SR	SPW	SPL	SPR
1	(Qatar) El-Majid–M. Assam	1	1	0	2	2	1	2.000	55	56	0.982
2	(Japan) Ikeda–Shiratori	1	0	1	1	1	2	0.500	56	55	1.018

Source: AVC

Date		Score		Set 1	Set 2	Set 3
24 Nov	El-Majid–M. Assam (Qatar)	2–1	(Japan) Ikeda–Shiratori	13–21	21–16	21–19

=== Knockout round ===
Round of 16; 25 November
N. Banlue–J. Surin	16	21	11
(Iran) Salemi B.–Abolhassan	21	19	15
(Qatar) El-Majid–M. Assam	20	21	12
(Philippines) Garcia–Arbasto	22	18	15
D. Kitti–T. Phanupong	21	21
T. Poravid–T. Pithak	16	12
N. Kangkon–K. Dunwinit	14	21	10
(Kazakhstan) Bogatu–Yakovlev	21	18	15
(Australia) McHugh–Burnett	21	21
(Japan) Ikeda–Shiratori	18	12
(Iran) S. Shekar–Aro	23	18	15
(Australia) Guehrer–Nicolaidis	21	21	10
(Iran) A. Mirzaali–A. Aghajani	21	15
(Australia) Carracher–Takken	23	21
(Japan) Hasegawa–Tsuchiya	9	15
(Qatar) Cherif–Ahmed	21	21

Quarterfinals; 26 November
(Iran) Salemi B.–Abolhassan	21	13	15
(Philippines) Garcia–Arbasto	19	21	10
D. Kitti–T. Phanupong	14	11
(Kazakhstan) Bogatu–Yakovlev	21	21
(Australia) McHugh–Burnett	23	21
(Iran) S. Shekar–Aro	21	12
(Australia) Carracher–Takken	14	12
(Qatar) Cherif–Ahmed	21	21

Semifinals; 26 November
(Iran) Salemi B.–Abolhassan	21	21
(Kazakhstan) Bogatu–Yakovlev	12	14
(Australia) McHugh–Burnett	21	21
(Qatar) Cherif–Ahmed	16	19

Final; 27 November
(Iran) Salemi B.–Abolhassan	16	13
(Australia) McHugh–Burnett	21	21
3rd place
(Kazakhstan) Bogatu–Yakovlev	15	15
(Qatar) Cherif–Ahmed	21	21

== Women's tournament ==
=== Preliminary round ===
==== Pool A ====
Pos	Team	Pld	W	L	Pts	SW	SL	SR	SPW	SPL	SPR
1	(Australia) Bell–Johnson	4	3	1	7	7	3	2.333	189	131	1.443
2	Radarong–Udomchavee	4	3	1	7	6	3	2.000	169	150	1.127
3	(Philippines) Rodriguez–Eslapor	4	2	2	6	5	4	1.250	166	159	1.044
4	(Kazakhstan) Rachenko–Ukolova	4	2	2	6	4	4	1.000	130	151	0.861
5	(Sri Lanka) Deepika–Hashini	4	0	4	4	0	8	0.000	106	169	0.627

Source: AVC

Date		Score		Set 1	Set 2	Set 3
23 Nov	Radarong–Udomchavee	2–0	(Sri Lanka) Deepika–Hashini	21–12	21–9	
23 Nov	Bell–Johnson (Australia)	2–1	(Philippines) Rodriguez–Eslapor	20–22	21–10	15–11
23 Nov	Radarong–Udomchavee	2–0	(Philippines) Rodriguez–Eslapor	21–16	24–22	
23 Nov	Rachenko–Ukolova (Kazakhstan)	2–0	(Sri Lanka) Deepika–Hashini	21–18	21–15	
24 Nov	Bell–Johnson (Australia)	2–0	(Kazakhstan) Rachenko–Ukolova	21–9	21–11	
24 Nov	Rodriguez–Eslapor (Philippines)	2–0	(Sri Lanka) Deepika–Hashini	22–20	21–12	
24 Nov	Radarong–Udomchavee	0–2	(Kazakhstan) Rachenko–Ukolova	17–21	17–21	
24 Nov	Bell–Johnson (Australia)	2–0	(Sri Lanka) Deepika–Hashini	21–15	21–5	
25 Nov	Radarong–Udomchavee	2–1	(Australia) Bell–Johnson	21–16	12–21	15–12
25 Nov	Rachenko–Ukolova (Kazakhstan)	0–2	(Philippines) Rodriguez–Eslapor	7–21	19–21	

==== Pool B ====
Pos	Team	Pld	W	L	Pts	SW	SL	SR	SPW	SPL	SPR
1	(Japan) Ishii–Mizoe	4	4	0	8	8	0	MAX	168	97	1.732
2	(Australia) Fleming–Fejes	4	3	1	7	6	3	2.000	167	145	1.152
3	Numwong–Charanrutwadee	4	2	2	6	5	4	1.250	165	142	1.162
4	(Kazakhstan) Ivanchenko–Kabulbekova	4	1	3	5	2	6	0.333	122	156	0.782
5	(Singapore) Tan A.K.Y.–Soh C.H.C.	4	0	4	4	0	8	0.000	86	168	0.512

Source: AVC

Date		Score		Set 1	Set 2	Set 3
23 Nov	Ishii–Mizoe (Japan)	2–0	(Singapore) Tan A.K.Y.–Soh C.H.C.	21–5	21–8	
23 Nov	Numwong–Charanrutwadee	2–0	(Kazakhstan) Ivanchenko–Kabulbekova	21–8	21–16	
23 Nov	Fleming–Fejes (Australia)	2–0	(Singapore) Tan A.K.Y.–Soh C.H.C.	21–8	21–14	
23 Nov	Ishii–Mizoe (Japan)	2–0	(Kazakhstan) Ivanchenko–Kabulbekova	21–14	21–10	
24 Nov	Numwong–Charanrutwadee	1–2	(Australia) Fleming–Fejes	21–17	21–23	7–15
24 Nov	Ivanchenko–Kabulbekova (Kazakhstan)	2–0	(Singapore) Tan A.K.Y.–Soh C.H.C.	21–14	21–16	
24 Nov	Ishii–Mizoe (Japan)	2–0	(Australia) Fleming–Fejes	21–16	21–12	
24 Nov	Numwong–Charanrutwadee	2–0	(Singapore) Tan A.K.Y.–Soh C.H.C.	21–11	21–10	
25 Nov	Ishii–Mizoe (Japan)	2–0	Numwong–Charanrutwadee	21–16	21–16	
25 Nov	Fleming–Fejes (Australia)	2–0	(Kazakhstan) Ivanchenko–Kabulbekova	21–17	21–15	

==== Pool C ====
Pos	Team	Pld	W	L	Pts	SW	SL	SR	SPW	SPL	SPR
1	(New Zealand) Polley–Zeimann	4	4	0	8	8	1	8.000	176	121	1.455
2	(Japan) Hasegawa–Sakaguchi	4	3	1	7	7	2	3.500	172	117	1.470
3	S. Apinya–B. Jidapa	4	2	2	6	4	5	0.800	157	145	1.083
4	(Singapore) Chong E.H.H.–Koh C.T.N.	4	1	3	5	3	7	0.429	139	185	0.751
5	(Sri Lanka) Dinesha–Jayawardana	4	0	4	4	1	8	0.125	104	180	0.578

Source: AVC

Date		Score		Set 1	Set 2	Set 3
23 Nov	Hasegawa–Sakaguchi (Japan)	2–0	(Sri Lanka) Dinesha–Jayawardana	21–11	21–9	
23 Nov	Polley–Zeimann (New Zealand)	2–0	S. Apinya–B. Jidapa	21–19	21–17	
23 Nov	Hasegawa–Sakaguchi (Japan)	2–0	S. Apinya–B. Jidapa	21–12	21–13	
23 Nov	Chong E.H.H.–Koh C.T.N. (Singapore)	2–1	(Sri Lanka) Dinesha–Jayawardana	18–21	21–15	15–11
24 Nov	Polley–Zeimann (New Zealand)	2–0	(Singapore) Chong E.H.H.–Koh C.T.N.	21–13	21–8	
24 Nov	S. Apinya–B. Jidapa	2–0	(Sri Lanka) Dinesha–Jayawardana	21–10	21–9	
24 Nov	Hasegawa–Sakaguchi (Japan)	2–0	(Singapore) Chong E.H.H.–Koh C.T.N.	21–12	21–10	
24 Nov	Polley–Zeimann (New Zealand)	2–0	(Sri Lanka) Dinesha–Jayawardana	21–7	21–11	
25 Nov	Hasegawa–Sakaguchi (Japan)	1–2	(New Zealand) Polley–Zeimann	21–14	19–21	6–15
25 Nov	Chong E.H.H.–Koh C.T.N. (Singapore)	1–2	S. Apinya–B. Jidapa	21–18	14–21	7–15

==== Pool D ====
Pos	Team	Pld	W	L	Pts	SW	SL	SR	SPW	SPL	SPR
1	Naraphornrapat–Worapeerachayakorn	3	3	0	6	6	0	MAX	126	81	1.556
2	(Japan) Shiba–Take	3	2	1	5	4	3	1.333	121	131	0.924
3	(Philippines) Rondina–Pons	3	1	2	4	3	4	0.750	121	129	0.938
4	(Australia) Stevens–Milutinovic	3	0	3	3	0	6	0.000	102	129	0.791

Source: AVC

Date		Score		Set 1	Set 2	Set 3
23 Nov	Shiba–Take (Japan)	2–0	(Australia) Stevens–Milutinovic	21–19	21–17	
23 Nov	Naraphornrapat–Worapeerachayakorn	2–0	(Australia) Stevens–Milutinovic	21–18	21–11	
24 Nov	Shiba–Take (Japan)	2–1	(Philippines) Rondina–Pons	13–21	22–20	15–12
24 Nov	Naraphornrapat–Worapeerachayakorn	2–0	(Philippines) Rondina–Pons	21–9	21–14	
25 Nov	Naraphornrapat–Worapeerachayakorn	2–0	(Japan) Shiba–Take	21–13	21–16	
25 Nov	Rondina–Pons (Philippines)	2–0	(Australia) Stevens–Milutinovic	21–15	24–22	

=== Knockout round ===
Round of 16; 25 November
(Australia) Bell–Johnson	21	21
(Kazakhstan) Ivanchenko–Kabulbekova	2	8
(Japan) Hasegawa–Sakaguchi	21	21
(Philippines) Rondina–Pons	17	15
(Australia) Fleming–Fejes	21	21
(Philippines) Rodriguez–Eslapor	17	14
(Singapore) Chong E.H.H.–Koh C.T.N.	13	6
Naraphornrapat–Worapeerachayakorn	21	21
(New Zealand) Polley–Zeimann	21	21
(Kazakhstan) Rachenko–Ukolova	7	11
S. Apinya–B. Jidapa	11	15
Radarong–Udomchavee	21	21
(Japan) Shiba–Take	21	21
Numwong–Charanrutwadee	19	14
(Australia) Stevens–Milutinovic	13	11
(Japan) Ishii–Mizoe	21	21

Quarterfinals; 26 November
(Australia) Bell–Johnson	21	21
(Japan) Hasegawa–Sakaguchi	19	19
(Australia) Fleming–Fejes	12	15
Naraphornrapat–Worapeerachayakorn	21	21
(New Zealand) Polley–Zeimann	14	21	15
Radarong–Udomchavee	21	13	9
(Japan) Shiba–Take	18	21	8
(Japan) Ishii–Mizoe	21	19	15

Semifinals; 26 November
(Australia) Bell–Johnson	16	17
Naraphornrapat–Worapeerachayakorn	21	21
(New Zealand) Polley–Zeimann	21	24	13
(Japan) Ishii–Mizoe	17	26	15

Final; 27 November
Naraphornrapat–Worapeerachayakorn	29	21
(Japan) Ishii–Mizoe	27	19
3rd place
(Australia) Bell–Johnson	21	22
(New Zealand) Polley–Zeimann	17	20
