= 2024 Asian Beach Volleyball Championships =

International beach volleyball competition

- Location: Santa Rosa, Philippines
- Dates: 5–10 November 2024

The 2024 Asian Beach Volleyball Championship was a beach volleyball event, held in November 2024 in Nuvali Sand Courts Santa Rosa, Laguna, Philippines.

== Medal summary ==
Event	Gold	Silver	Bronze
Men	Australia; D'Artagnan Potts; Jack Pearse	Australia; Mark Nicolaidis; Izac Carracher	Iran; Abbas Pourasgari; Alireza Aghajani
Women	China; Wang Jingzhe; Xia Xinyi	China; Xue Chen; Zeng Jinjin	Australia; Jana Milutinovic; Stefanie Fejes

== Participating nations ==
=== Men ===
- Australia (4)
- China (3)
- Hong Kong (1)
- Indonesia (2)
- Iran (3)
- Japan (4)
- Kazakhstan (2)
- New Zealand (2)
- Oman (2)
- Philippines (3)
- Thailand (4)
- Vietnam (3)

=== Women ===
- Australia (4)
- China (4)
- Indonesia (2)
- Japan (4)
- Kazakhstan (2)
- New Zealand (1)
- Philippines (3)
- Singapore (2)
- Thailand (4)
- Vanuatu (1)

== Men's tournament ==
=== Qualification ===
==== Round 1 ====
Date		Score		Set 1	Set 2	Set 3
05 Nov	N.T. Sang–N.H. Long (Vietnam)	2–0	(Hong Kong) Chong–Y.C. Wong	21–17	21–16	
05 Nov	Nouh–Haitham (Oman)	2–1	(Vietnam) D.G. Luân–L.H. Y	18–21	21–14	15–13
05 Nov	Tolentino–Rosales (Philippines)	0–2	(Iran) Salemi B.–Abolhassan	8–21	10–21	
05 Nov	Mokhammad–Ryukhov (Kazakhstan)	2–0	(China) Liu Y.–Mao Yuan	23–21	21–12	
05 Nov	Song Jinyang–Zhang Tai (China)	2–0	(Vietnam) C.N. Minh–T.S. Phận	21–11	21–18	

==== Round 2 ====
Date		Score		Set 1	Set 2	Set 3
05 Nov	Hasegawa–Dylan (Japan)	2–0	(Vietnam) N.T. Sang–N.H. Long	21–8	21–10	
05 Nov	Nouh–Haitham (Oman)	0–2	(Iran) Salemi B.–Abolhassan	13–21	12–21	
05 Nov	Yakovlev–Bogatu (Kazakhstan)	2–0	(Kazakhstan) Mokhammad–Ryukhov	21–18	21–19	
05 Nov	Song Jinyang–Zhang Tai (China)	2–0	(Indonesia) Yosi–Dimas	21–17	26–24	

=== Preliminary round ===
==== Pool A ====
Pos	Team	Pld	W	L	Pts	SW	SL	SR	SPW	SPL	SPR
1	(Iran) A. Pourasgari–A. Aghajani	3	3	0	6	6	1	6.000	140	110	1.273
2	(Australia) Nicolaidis–Carracher	3	2	1	5	4	3	1.333	134	122	1.098
3	(Japan) Malki–Fukushima	3	1	2	4	3	5	0.600	122	137	0.891
4	(China) Song Jinyang–Zhang Tai	3	0	3	3	2	6	0.333	121	148	0.818

Source: AVC

Date		Score		Set 1	Set 2	Set 3
06 Nov	Nicolaidis–Carracher (Australia)	2–0	(China) Song Jinyang–Zhang Tai	21–16	21–18	
06 Nov	A. Pourasgari–A. Aghajani (Iran)	2–0	(Japan) Malki–Fukushima	21–15	21–11	
07 Nov	Nicolaidis–Carracher (Australia)	2–1	(Japan) Malki–Fukushima	21–16	16–21	15–6
07 Nov	A. Pourasgari–A. Aghajani (Iran)	2–1	(China) Song Jinyang–Zhang Tai	17–21	21–15	15–8
07 Nov	Malki–Fukushima (Japan)	2–1	(China) Song Jinyang–Zhang Tai	17–21	21–13	15–9
07 Nov	Nicolaidis–Carracher (Australia)	0–2	(Iran) A. Pourasgari–A. Aghajani	22–24	18–21	

==== Pool B ====
Pos	Team	Pld	W	L	Pts	SW	SL	SR	SPW	SPL	SPR
1	(Australia) Hodges–Schubert	3	3	0	6	6	0	MAX	131	111	1.180
2	(Iran) Salemi B.–Abolhassan	3	2	1	5	4	2	2.000	126	90	1.400
3	(Thailand) J. Surin–K. Kittituch	3	1	2	4	2	4	0.500	96	117	0.821
4	(New Zealand) Krajci–McManaway	3	0	3	3	0	6	0.000	91	126	0.722

Source: AVC

Date		Score		Set 1	Set 2	Set 3
06 Nov	Hodges–Schubert (Australia)	2–0	(Iran) Salemi B.–Abolhassan	21–18	26–24	
06 Nov	Krajci–McManaway (New Zealand)	0–2	(Thailand) J. Surin–K. Kittituch	17–21	16–21	
07 Nov	Hodges–Schubert (Australia)	2–0	(Thailand) J. Surin–K. Kittituch	21–17	21–19	
07 Nov	Krajci–McManaway (New Zealand)	0–2	(Iran) Salemi B.–Abolhassan	13–21	12–21	
07 Nov	J. Surin–K. Kittituch (Thailand)	0–2	(Iran) Salemi B.–Abolhassan	9–21	9–21	
07 Nov	Hodges–Schubert (Australia)	2–0	(New Zealand) Krajci–McManaway	21–16	21–17	

==== Pool C ====
Pos	Team	Pld	W	L	Pts	SW	SL	SR	SPW	SPL	SPR
1	(Australia) Potts–Pearse	3	3	0	6	6	2	3.000	154	123	1.252
2	(Thailand) K. Dunwinit–N. Banlue	3	2	1	5	5	3	1.667	142	133	1.068
3	(Japan) Kai–Adachi	3	1	2	4	4	4	1.000	137	141	0.972
4	(Philippines) Francisco–Varga	3	0	3	3	0	6	0.000	90	126	0.714

Source: AVC

Date		Score		Set 1	Set 2	Set 3
06 Nov	Potts–Pearse (Australia)	2–0	(Philippines) Francisco–Varga	21–11	21–16	
06 Nov	K. Dunwinit–N. Banlue (Thailand)	2–1	(Japan) Kai–Adachi	21–12	18–21	15–12
07 Nov	Potts–Pearse (Australia)	2–1	(Japan) Kai–Adachi	19–21	21–14	17–15
07 Nov	K. Dunwinit–N. Banlue (Thailand)	2–0	(Philippines) Francisco–Varga	21–14	21–19	
07 Nov	Kai–Adachi (Japan)	2–0	(Philippines) Francisco–Varga	21–13	21–17	
07 Nov	Potts–Pearse (Australia)	2–1	(Thailand) K. Dunwinit–N. Banlue	21–13	19–21	15–12

==== Pool D ====
Pos	Team	Pld	W	L	Pts	SW	SL	SR	SPW	SPL	SPR
1	(Australia) Howat–Ryan	3	2	1	5	5	2	2.500	125	117	1.068
2	(Japan) Takahashi–Ikeda	3	2	1	5	4	3	1.333	132	135	0.978
3	(Kazakhstan) Yakovlev–Bogatu	3	2	1	5	5	4	1.250	162	148	1.095
4	(Thailand) T. Pithak–T. Poravid	3	0	3	3	1	6	0.167	122	141	0.865

Source: AVC

Date		Score		Set 1	Set 2	Set 3
06 Nov	T. Pithak–T. Poravid (Thailand)	1–2	(Kazakhstan) Yakovlev–Bogatu	21–19	19–21	12–15
06 Nov	Takahashi–Ikeda (Japan)	0–2	(Australia) Howat–Ryan	18–21	15–21	
07 Nov	T. Pithak–T. Poravid (Thailand)	0–2	(Australia) Howat–Ryan	21–23	14–21	
07 Nov	Takahashi–Ikeda (Japan)	2–1	(Kazakhstan) Yakovlev–Bogatu	25–23	16–21	16–14
07 Nov	Howat–Ryan (Australia)	1–2	(Kazakhstan) Yakovlev–Bogatu	10–21	21–13	8–15
07 Nov	T. Pithak–T. Poravid (Thailand)	0–2	(Japan) Takahashi–Ikeda	18–21	17–21	

==== Pool E ====
Pos	Team	Pld	W	L	Pts	SW	SL	SR	SPW	SPL	SPR
1	(Indonesia) Bintang–Sofyan	3	3	0	6	6	1	6.000	135	112	1.205
2	(China) Wu Jiaxin–Ha Likejiang	3	1	2	4	4	5	0.800	154	152	1.013
3	(Iran) Ghalehnovi–Akbarzadeh K.	3	1	2	4	3	4	0.750	120	134	0.896
4	(Oman) Mazin–Hood	3	1	2	4	2	5	0.400	121	132	0.917

Source: AVC

Date		Score		Set 1	Set 2	Set 3
06 Nov	Wu Jiaxin–Ha Likejiang (China)	1–2	(Oman) Mazin–Hood	19–21	21–17	8–15
06 Nov	Bintang–Sofyan (Indonesia)	2–0	(Iran) Ghalehnovi–Akbarzadeh K.	21–19	21–11	
07 Nov	Wu Jiaxin–Ha Likejiang (China)	2–1	(Iran) Ghalehnovi–Akbarzadeh K.	22–24	21–19	15–5
07 Nov	Bintang–Sofyan (Indonesia)	2–0	(Oman) Mazin–Hood	21–17	21–17	
07 Nov	Ghalehnovi–Akbarzadeh K. (Iran)	2–0	(Oman) Mazin–Hood	21–17	21–17	
07 Nov	Wu Jiaxin–Ha Likejiang (China)	1–2	(Indonesia) Bintang–Sofyan	21–15	19–21	8–15

==== Pool F ====
Pos	Team	Pld	W	L	Pts	SW	SL	SR	SPW	SPL	SPR
1	(Thailand) Netitorn–M. Wachirawit	3	3	0	6	6	0	MAX	128	74	1.730
2	(New Zealand) Nicklin–Hartles	3	1	2	4	3	4	0.750	137	137	1.000
3	(Japan) Hasegawa–Dylan	3	1	2	4	3	5	0.600	143	157	0.911
4	(Philippines) Abdilla–Buytrago	3	1	2	4	2	5	0.400	100	140	0.714

Source: AVC

Date		Score		Set 1	Set 2	Set 3
06 Nov	Abdilla–Buytrago (Philippines)	0–2	(New Zealand) Nicklin–Hartles	20–22	19–21	
06 Nov	Netitorn–M. Wachirawit (Thailand)	2–0	(Japan) Hasegawa–Dylan	21–18	21–16	
07 Nov	Abdilla–Buytrago (Philippines)	2–1	(Japan) Hasegawa–Dylan	22–24	24–22	15–9
07 Nov	Netitorn–M. Wachirawit (Thailand)	2–0	(New Zealand) Nicklin–Hartles	21–19	23–21	
07 Nov	Hasegawa–Dylan (Japan)	2–1	(New Zealand) Nicklin–Hartles	23–21	16–21	15–12
07 Nov	Abdilla–Buytrago (Philippines)	0–2	(Thailand) Netitorn–M. Wachirawit	Walkover		

=== Knockout round ===
Round of 18
Date		Score		Set 1	Set 2	Set 3
08 Nov	Hasegawa–Dylan (Japan)	2–1	(Japan) Malki–Fukushima	23–21	19–21	15–12
08 Nov	Ghalehnovi–Akbarzadeh K. (Iran)	2–0	(Thailand) J. Surin–K. Kittituch	21–14	21–12	

Round of 16; 8 November
(Australia) Hodges–Schubert	21	21
(Japan) Hasegawa–Dylan	12	14
(China) Wu Jiaxin–Ha Likejiang	21	21
(Thailand) K. Dunwinit–N. Banlue	12	14
(Japan) Takahashi–Ikeda	17	17
(Australia) Potts–Pearse	21	21
(Kazakhstan) Yakovlev–Bogatu	26	17	15
(Indonesia) Bintang–Sofyan	24	21	12
(Australia) Howat–Ryan	21	21
(Japan) Kai–Adachi	12	11
(Thailand) Netitorn–M. Wachirawit	9	19
(Australia) Nicolaidis–Carracher	21	21
(Iran) Salemi B.–Abolhassan	W	O
(New Zealand) Nicklin–Hartles
(Iran) Ghalehnovi–Akbarzadeh K.	14	21
(Iran) A. Pourasgari–A. Aghajani	21	23

Quarterfinals; 9 November
(Australia) Hodges–Schubert	21	18
(China) Wu Jiaxin–Ha Likejiang	23	21
(Australia) Potts–Pearse	17	21	15
(Kazakhstan) Yakovlev–Bogatu	21	17	12
(Australia) Howat–Ryan	11	27
(Australia) Nicolaidis–Carracher	21	29
(Iran) Salemi B.–Abolhassan	22	24	13
(Iran) A. Pourasgari–A. Aghajani	20	26	15

Semifinals; 9 November
(China) Wu Jiaxin–Ha Likejiang	21	22
(Australia) Potts–Pearse	23	24
(Australia) Nicolaidis–Carracher	21	17	15
(Iran) A. Pourasgari–A. Aghajani	13	21	13

Final; 10 November
(Australia) Potts–Pearse	21	21
(Australia) Nicolaidis–Carracher	19	19
3rd place
(China) Wu Jiaxin–Ha Likejiang	15	17
(Iran) A. Pourasgari–A. Aghajani	21	21

== Women's tournament ==
=== Qualification ===
Date		Score		Set 1	Set 2	Set 3
05 Nov	Polidario–Gaviola (Philippines)	0–2	(Indonesia) Josephine–Devi	21–23	15–21	
05 Nov	Motomura–Nayu (Japan)	2–0	(Singapore) Chong E.H.H.–Ang H.Y.	21–15	21–14	
05 Nov	Dipoditiro F.N.–Lee X.E.V (Singapore)	0–2	(Thailand) Udomchavee–Numwong	10–21	10–21	

=== Preliminary round ===
==== Pool A ====
Pos	Team	Pld	W	L	Pts	SW	SL	SR	SPW	SPL	SPR
1	(China) J.Zh. Wang–X.Y. Xia	3	3	0	6	6	0	MAX	126	75	1.680
2	(Australia) Phillips–Mears	3	2	1	5	4	2	2.000	111	98	1.133
3	(Kazakhstan) Kabulbekova–Ivanchenko	3	1	2	4	2	4	0.500	91	116	0.784
4	(Indonesia) Josephine–Devi	3	0	3	3	0	6	0.000	87	126	0.690

Source: AVC

Date		Score		Set 1	Set 2	Set 3
06 Nov	J.Zh. Wang–X.Y. Xia (China)	2–0	(Indonesia) Josephine–Devi	21–14	21–10	
06 Nov	Kabulbekova–Ivanchenko (Kazakhstan)	0–2	(Australia) Phillips–Mears	12–21	13–21	
06 Nov	J.Zh. Wang–X.Y. Xia (China)	2–0	(Australia) Phillips–Mears	21–11	21–16	
06 Nov	Kabulbekova–Ivanchenko (Kazakhstan)	2–0	(Indonesia) Josephine–Devi	21–17	21–15	
07 Nov	Phillips–Mears (Australia)	2–0	(Indonesia) Josephine–Devi	21–13	21–18	
07 Nov	J.Zh. Wang–X.Y. Xia (China)	2–0	(Kazakhstan) Kabulbekova–Ivanchenko	21–10	21–14	

==== Pool B ====
Pos	Team	Pld	W	L	Pts	SW	SL	SR	SPW	SPL	SPR
1	(Australia) Milutinovic–Fejes	3	3	0	6	6	0	MAX	128	82	1.561
2	(Indonesia) Desi–Nur Atika	3	2	1	5	4	3	1.333	120	110	1.091
3	(Japan) Motomura–Nayu	3	1	2	4	2	4	0.500	89	126	0.706
4	(Thailand) S. Patcharaporn–S. Samitta	3	0	3	3	1	6	0.167	126	145	0.869

Source: AVC

Date		Score		Set 1	Set 2	Set 3
06 Nov	Milutinovic–Fejes (Australia)	2–0	(Japan) Motomura–Nayu	21–10	21–13	
06 Nov	Desi–Nur Atika (Indonesia)	2–1	(Thailand) S. Patcharaporn–S. Samitta	22–20	18–21	15–7
06 Nov	Milutinovic–Fejes (Australia)	2–0	(Thailand) S. Patcharaporn–S. Samitta	23–21	21–15	
06 Nov	Desi–Nur Atika (Indonesia)	2–0	(Japan) Motomura–Nayu	21–13	21–7	
07 Nov	S. Patcharaporn–S. Samitta (Thailand)	0–2	(Japan) Motomura–Nayu	21–23	21–23	
07 Nov	Milutinovic–Fejes (Australia)	2–0	(Indonesia) Desi–Nur Atika	21–6	21–17	

==== Pool C ====
Pos	Team	Pld	W	L	Pts	SW	SL	SR	SPW	SPL	SPR
1	(Thailand) Naraphornrapat–Woranatchayakorn	3	3	0	6	6	0	MAX	127	103	1.233
2	(China) Yan X.–Zhou M.L.	3	2	1	5	4	2	2.000	117	107	1.093
3	(Australia) Stevens–Zajer	3	1	2	4	2	4	0.500	110	107	1.028
4	(Japan) Riko–Take	3	0	3	3	0	6	0.000	90	127	0.709

Source: AVC

Date		Score		Set 1	Set 2	Set 3
06 Nov	Naraphornrapat–Woranatchayakorn (Thailand)	2–0	(Australia) Stevens–Zajer	21–16	21–16	
06 Nov	Yan X.–Zhou M.L. (China)	2–0	(Japan) Riko–Take	21–19	21–10	
06 Nov	Naraphornrapat–Woranatchayakorn (Thailand)	2–0	(Japan) Riko–Take	22–20	21–18	
06 Nov	Yan X.–Zhou M.L. (China)	2–0	(Australia) Stevens–Zajer	21–17	21–19	
07 Nov	Riko–Take (Japan)	0–2	(Australia) Stevens–Zajer	15–21	8–21	
07 Nov	Naraphornrapat–Woranatchayakorn (Thailand)	2–0	(China) Yan X.–Zhou M.L.	21–16	21–17	

==== Pool D ====
Pos	Team	Pld	W	L	Pts	SW	SL	SR	SPW	SPL	SPR
1	(China) Xue–J.J. Zeng	3	3	0	6	6	0	MAX	126	76	1.658
2	(Japan) Ren–Non	3	2	1	5	4	2	2.000	109	95	1.147
3	(Thailand) M. Salinda–K. Somruedee	3	1	2	4	2	5	0.400	105	131	0.802
4	(Vanuatu) Toko–Lawac	3	0	3	3	1	6	0.167	96	134	0.716

Source: AVC

Date		Score		Set 1	Set 2	Set 3
06 Nov	Xue–J.J. Zeng (China)	2–0	(Japan) Ren–Non	21–14	21–11	
06 Nov	Toko–Lawac (Vanuatu)	1–2	(Thailand) M. Salinda–K. Somruedee	21–14	18–21	8–15
06 Nov	Xue–J.J. Zeng (China)	2–0	(Thailand) M. Salinda–K. Somruedee	21–11	21–13	
06 Nov	Toko–Lawac (Vanuatu)	0–2	(Japan) Ren–Non	8–21	14–21	
07 Nov	M. Salinda–K. Somruedee (Thailand)	0–2	(Japan) Ren–Non	18–21	13–21	
07 Nov	Xue–J.J. Zeng (China)	2–0	(Vanuatu) Toko–Lawac	21–10	21–17	

==== Pool E ====
Pos	Team	Pld	W	L	Pts	SW	SL	SR	SPW	SPL	SPR
1	(Australia) Fleming–Alchin	3	2	1	5	5	2	2.500	134	111	1.207
2	(New Zealand) Polley–MacDonald	3	2	1	5	4	3	1.333	132	119	1.109
3	(Philippines) Progella–Pagara	3	1	2	4	3	4	0.750	112	129	0.868
4	(China) Yu T.–Jiang K.Y.	3	1	2	4	2	6	0.333	112	131	0.855

Source: AVC

Date		Score		Set 1	Set 2	Set 3
06 Nov	Polley–MacDonald (New Zealand)	0–2	(Philippines) Progella–Pagara	19–21	18–21	
06 Nov	Fleming–Alchin (Australia)	2–0	(China) Yu T.–Jiang K.Y.	21–17	21–18	
06 Nov	Polley–MacDonald (New Zealand)	2–0	(China) Yu T.–Jiang K.Y.	21–13	21–14	
06 Nov	Fleming–Alchin (Australia)	2–0	(Philippines) Progella–Pagara	21–10	21–13	
07 Nov	Yu T.–Jiang K.Y. (China)	2–1	(Philippines) Progella–Pagara	14–21	21–16	15–10
07 Nov	Polley–MacDonald (New Zealand)	2–1	(Australia) Fleming–Alchin	17–21	21–19	15–10

==== Pool F ====
Pos	Team	Pld	W	L	Pts	SW	SL	SR	SPW	SPL	SPR
1	(Japan) Shiba–Maruyama	3	3	0	6	6	0	MAX	126	84	1.500
2	(Thailand) Udomchavee–Numwong	3	2	1	5	4	2	2.000	116	92	1.261
3	(Philippines) Eslapor–Orillaneda	3	1	2	4	2	4	0.500	89	116	0.767
4	(Kazakhstan) Ryukhova–Ukolova	3	0	3	3	0	6	0.000	87	126	0.690

Source: AVC

Date		Score		Set 1	Set 2	Set 3
06 Nov	Eslapor–Orillaneda (Philippines)	2–0	(Kazakhstan) Ryukhova–Ukolova	21–19	21–13	
06 Nov	Shiba–Maruyama (Japan)	2–0	(Thailand) Udomchavee–Numwong	21–15	21–17	
06 Nov	Eslapor–Orillaneda (Philippines)	0–2	(Thailand) Udomchavee–Numwong	10–21	13–21	
06 Nov	Shiba–Maruyama (Japan)	2–0	(Kazakhstan) Ryukhova–Ukolova	21–10	21–18	
07 Nov	Udomchavee–Numwong (Thailand)	2–0	(Kazakhstan) Ryukhova–Ukolova	21–14	21–13	
07 Nov	Eslapor–Orillaneda (Philippines)	0–2	(Japan) Shiba–Maruyama	10–21	14–21	

=== Knockout round ===
Round of 18
Date		Score		Set 1	Set 2	Set 3
08 Nov	Motomura–Nayu (Japan)	0–2	(Philippines) Eslapor–Orillaneda	18–21	16–21	
08 Nov	Kabulbekova–Ivanchenko (Kazakhstan)	1–2	(Thailand) M. Salinda–K. Somruedee	23–21	12–21	11–15

Round of 16; 8 November
(China) J.Zh. Wang–X.Y. Xia	21	21
(Philippines) Eslapor–Orillaneda	13	8
(Thailand) Udomchavee–Numwong	15	18
(China) Yan X.–Zhou M.L.	21	21
(Indonesia) Desi–Nur Atika	19	6
(Japan) Shiba–Maruyama	21	21
(Australia) Stevens–Zajer	21	14	12
(Australia) Fleming–Alchin	14	21	15
(China) Xue–J.J. Zeng	21	21
(Philippines) Progella–Pagara	14	11
(Thailand) Naraphornrapat–Woranatchayakorn	14	15
(Australia) Phillips–Mears	21	21
(New Zealand) Polley–MacDonald	22	21
(Japan) Ren–Non	20	18
(Thailand) M. Salinda–K. Somruedee	10	12
(Australia) Milutinovic–Fejes	21	21

Quarterfinals; 9 November
(China) J.Zh. Wang–X.Y. Xia	17	21	15
(China) Yan X.–Zhou M.L.	21	8	9
(Japan) Shiba–Maruyama	21	21
(Australia) Fleming–Alchin	16	18
(China) Xue–J.J. Zeng	21	21
(Australia) Phillips–Mears	16	18
(New Zealand) Polley–MacDonald	17	15
(Australia) Milutinovic–Fejes	21	21

Semifinals; 9 November
(China) J.Zh. Wang–X.Y. Xia	21	21
(Japan) Shiba–Maruyama	17	15
(China) Xue–J.J. Zeng	22	14	15
(Australia) Milutinovic–Fejes	20	21	13

Final; 10 November
(China) J.Zh. Wang–X.Y. Xia	21	21
(China) Xue–J.J. Zeng	18	19
3rd place
(Japan) Shiba–Maruyama	15	19
(Australia) Milutinovic–Fejes	21	21
