= Beach volleyball at the 2026 Asian Games – Women's tournament =

Women at the 2026 Asian Games
- Venue: Hekinan Ryokuchi Beach Court
- Dates: 20 September – 2 October 2026
- Competitors: 52 from 16 nations

Medalists
gold medal	Taravadee Naraphornrapat; Worapeerachayakorn Kongphopsarutawadee	Thailand
silver medal	Xia Xinyi; Yan Xu (beach volleyball)	China
bronze medal	Khylem Progella; Sofiah Shanine Pagara	Philippines

The women's beach volleyball tournament at the 2026 Asian Games took place at the Hekinan Ryokuchi Beach Court in Hekinan, Aichi Prefecture, Japan from 20 September to 2 October 2026. Thailand's Taravadee Naraphornrapat and Worapeerachayakorn Kongphopsarutawadee won the gold medal, China's Xia Xinyi and Yan Xu (beach volleyball) took silver, and the Philippines' Khylem Progella and Sofiah Shanine Pagara the bronze.

== Schedule ==
All times are Japan Standard Time (UTC+09:00)

Date	Time	Event
Sunday, 20 September 2026	09:00	Preliminary round
Monday, 21 September 2026	09:00	Preliminary round
Tuesday, 22 September 2026	09:00	Preliminary round
Wednesday, 23 September 2026	09:00	Preliminary round
Thursday, 24 September 2026	09:00	Preliminary round
Friday, 25 September 2026	09:00	Preliminary round
Saturday, 26 September 2026	09:00	Preliminary round
Sunday, 27 September 2026	09:00	Preliminary round
Monday, 28 September 2026	09:00	Round of 16
Wednesday, 30 September 2026	09:00	Quarterfinals
Thursday, 1 October 2026	09:00	Semifinals
Friday, 2 October 2026	12:00	Bronze medal match
Friday, 2 October 2026	13:00	Gold medal match

== Results ==
Legend

- Ret — Retired

=== Preliminary round ===
==== Pool A ====
Pos	Team	Pld	W	L	Pts	SW	SL	SR	SPW	SPL	SPR	Qualification
1	Matsumoto–Matsumoto (JPN)	2	2	0	4	4	1	4.000	99	61	1.623	Round of 16
2	Nguyen–Chau (VIE)	2	1	1	3	3	2	1.500	90	73	1.233	Round of 16
3	Erdenesukh–Purevjargal (MGL)	2	0	2	2	0	4	0.000	29	84	0.345	

Source: OCA

Date		Score		Set 1	Set 2	Set 3
20 Sep	Matsumoto–Matsumoto (JPN)	2–0	Erdenesukh–Purevjargal (MGL)	21–6	21–7	
22 Sep	Nguyen–Chau (VIE)	2–0	Erdenesukh–Purevjargal (MGL)	21–9	21–7	
24 Sep	Matsumoto–Matsumoto (JPN)	2–1	Nguyen–Chau (VIE)	21–13	21–23	15–12

==== Pool B ====
Pos	Team	Pld	W	L	Pts	SW	SL	SR	SPW	SPL	SPR	Qualification
1	Xia–Yan (CHN)	2	2	0	4	4	0	MAX	84	54	1.556	Round of 16
2	Dinh–Mai (VIE)	2	1	1	3	2	2	1.000	68	75	0.907	Round of 16
3	Leong–Law (MAC)	2	0	2	2	0	4	0.000	62	85	0.729	

Source: OCA

Date		Score		Set 1	Set 2	Set 3
20 Sep	Xia–Yan (CHN)	2–0	Leong–Law (MAC)	21–13	21–16	
22 Sep	Dinh–Mai (VIE)	2–0	Leong–Law (MAC)	21–13	22–20	
24 Sep	Xia–Yan (CHN)	2–0	Dinh–Mai (VIE)	21–14	21–11	

==== Pool C ====
Pos	Team	Pld	W	L	Pts	SW	SL	SR	SPW	SPL	SPR	Qualification
1	Cao–Dong (CHN)	2	2	0	4	4	0	MAX	84	30	2.800	Round of 16
2	Kudaikulova–Rasulbek (KGZ)	2	1	1	3	2	3	0.667	72	85	0.847	Round of 16
3	Seo–Kim (KOR)	2	0	2	2	1	4	0.250	56	97	0.577	

Source: OCA

Date		Score		Set 1	Set 2	Set 3
20 Sep	Cao–Dong (CHN)	2–0	Seo–Kim (KOR)	21–7	21–6	
22 Sep	Kudaikulova–Rasulbek (KGZ)	2–1	Seo–Kim (KOR)	21–17	19–21	15–5
25 Sep	Cao–Dong (CHN)	2–0	Kudaikulova–Rasulbek (KGZ)	21–7	21–10	

==== Pool D ====
Pos	Team	Pld	W	L	Pts	SW	SL	SR	SPW	SPL	SPR	Qualification
1	Naraphornrapat–Kongphopsarutawadee (THA)	2	2	0	4	4	0	MAX	84	31	2.710	Round of 16
2	Kim–Shin (KOR)	2	1	1	3	2	3	0.667	76	96	0.792	Round of 16
3	Goh–Goh (MAS)	2	0	2	2	1	4	0.250	69	102	0.676	

Source: OCA

Date		Score		Set 1	Set 2	Set 3
20 Sep	Naraphornrapat–Kongphopsarutawadee (THA)	2–0	Kim–Shin (KOR)	21–8	21–8	
22 Sep	Goh–Goh (MAS)	1–2	Kim–Shin (KOR)	23–21	15–21	16–18
25 Sep	Naraphornrapat–Kongphopsarutawadee (THA)	2–0	Goh–Goh (MAS)	21–8	21–7	

==== Pool E ====
Pos	Team	Pld	W	L	Pts	SW	SL	SR	SPW	SPL	SPR	Qualification
1	Kozhakhmet–Kabulbekova (KAZ)	2	2	0	4	4	1	4.000	88	56	1.571	Round of 16
2	Pons–Rondina (PHI)	2	1	1	3	3	2	1.500	90	58	1.552	Round of 16
3	Khatun–Khatun (BAN)	2	0	2	2	0	4	0.000	20	84	0.238	

Source: OCA

Date		Score		Set 1	Set 2	Set 3
20 Sep	Pons–Rondina (PHI)	2–0	Khatun–Khatun (BAN)	21–6	21–6	
23 Sep	Kozhakhmet–Kabulbekova (KAZ)	2–0	Khatun–Khatun (BAN)	21–6	21–2	
25 Sep	Pons–Rondina (PHI)	1–2	Kozhakhmet–Kabulbekova (KAZ)	17–21	21–10	10–15

==== Pool F ====
Pos	Team	Pld	W	L	Pts	SW	SL	SR	SPW	SPL	SPR	Qualification
1	Ito–Sawame (JPN)	2	2	0	4	4	0	MAX	84	29	2.897	Round of 16
2	Karimova–Ryukhova (KAZ)	2	1	1	3	2	2	1.000	61	55	1.109	Round of 16
3	Bahmanzadeh–Ashraf (QAT)	2	0	2	2	0	4	0.000	23	84	0.274	

Source: OCA

Date		Score		Set 1	Set 2	Set 3
20 Sep	Ito–Sawame (JPN)	2–0	Bahmanzadeh–Ashraf (QAT)	21–7	21–3	
23 Sep	Karimova–Ryukhova (KAZ)	2–0	Bahmanzadeh–Ashraf (QAT)	21–7	21–6	
25 Sep	Ito–Sawame (JPN)	2–0	Karimova–Ryukhova (KAZ)	21–12	21–7	

==== Pool G ====
Pos	Team	Pld	W	L	Pts	SW	SL	SR	SPW	SPL	SPR	Qualification
1	Progella–Pagara (PHI)	3	3	0	6	6	0	MAX	126	59	2.136	Round of 16
2	To–To (HKG)	3	2	1	5	4	2	2.000	120	63	1.905	Round of 16
3	Fathimath–Aminath (MDV)	3	1	2	4	2	4	0.500	70	113	0.619	
4	Batjargal–Gantogtokh (MGL)	3	0	3	3	0	6	0.000	45	126	0.357	

Source: OCA

Date		Score		Set 1	Set 2	Set 3
21 Sep	Progella–Pagara (PHI)	2–0	Fathimath–Aminath (MDV)	21–6	21–11	
21 Sep	To–To (HKG)	2–0	Batjargal–Gantogtokh (MGL)	21–7	21–3	
23 Sep	To–To (HKG)	2–0	Fathimath–Aminath (MDV)	21–2	21–9	
23 Sep	Progella–Pagara (PHI)	2–0	Batjargal–Gantogtokh (MGL)	21–3	21–3	
26 Sep	Progella–Pagara (PHI)	2–0	To–To (HKG)	21–19	21–17	
26 Sep	Fathimath–Aminath (MDV)	2–0	Batjargal–Gantogtokh (MGL)	21–14	21–15	

==== Pool H ====
Pos	Team	Pld	W	L	Pts	SW	SL	SR	SPW	SPL	SPR	Qualification
1	Seehawong–Mungkhon (THA)	3	3	0	6	6	0	MAX	126	59	2.136	Round of 16
2	Wong–Tsang (HKG)	3	2	1	5	4	2	2.000	114	90	1.267	Round of 16
3	Kasuni–Chathurika (SRI)	3	1	2	4	2	4	0.500	100	99	1.010	
4	Hashim–Ismail (QAT)	3	0	3	3	0	6	0.000	34	126	0.270	

Source: OCA

Date		Score		Set 1	Set 2	Set 3
21 Sep	Wong–Tsang (HKG)	2–0	Kasuni–Chathurika (SRI)	21–14	21–17	
21 Sep	Seehawong–Mungkhon (THA)	2–0	Hashim–Ismail (QAT)	21–1	21–1	
24 Sep	Wong–Tsang (HKG)	2–0	Hashim–Ismail (QAT)	21–6	21–11	
24 Sep	Seehawong–Mungkhon (THA)	2–0	Kasuni–Chathurika (SRI)	21–13	21–14	
27 Sep	Wong–Tsang (HKG)	0–2	Seehawong–Mungkhon (THA)	11–21	19–21	
27 Sep	Kasuni–Chathurika (SRI)	2–0	Hashim–Ismail (QAT)	21–7	21–8	

=== Knockout round ===
Round of 16
Matsumoto–Matsumoto (JPN)	21	21
Kudaikulova–Rasulbek (KGZ)	10	12
Wong–Tsang (HKG)	24	18
Progella–Pagara (PHI)	26	21
Ito–Sawame (JPN)	17	15
Pons–Rondina (PHI)	21	21
Karimova–Ryukhova (KAZ)	8	7
Naraphornrapat–Kongphopsarutawadee (THA)	21	21
Cao–Dong (CHN)	21	21
Nguyen–Chau (VIE)	13	13
Dinh–Mai (VIE)	16	13
Seehawong–Mungkhon (THA)	21	21
Kozhakhmet–Kabulbekova (KAZ)	21	21
To–To (HKG)	19	19
Kim–Shin (KOR)	6	12
Xia–Yan (CHN)	21	21

Quarterfinals
Matsumoto–Matsumoto (JPN)	22	20
Progella–Pagara (PHI)	24	22
Pons–Rondina (PHI)	17	21	13
Naraphornrapat–Kongphopsarutawadee (THA)	21	12	15
Cao–Dong (CHN)	21	21
Seehawong–Mungkhon (THA)	18	13
Kozhakhmet–Kabulbekova (KAZ)	12	15
Xia–Yan (CHN)	21	21

Semifinals
Progella–Pagara (PHI)	21	18
Naraphornrapat–Kongphopsarutawadee (THA)	23	21
Cao–Dong (CHN)	21	22
Xia–Yan (CHN)	23	24

Gold medal match
Naraphornrapat–Kongphopsarutawadee (THA)	21	13	15
Xia–Yan (CHN)	17	21	8
Bronze medal match
Progella–Pagara (PHI)	13	23	15
Cao–Dong (CHN)	21	21	13

== Final standing ==
Rank	Team	Pld	W	L
1st place, gold medalist(s)	Taravadee Naraphornrapat – Worapeerachayakorn Kongphopsarutawadee (THA)	6	6	0
2nd place, silver medalist(s)	Xia Xinyi – Yan Xu (beach volleyball) (CHN)	6	5	1
3rd place, bronze medalist(s)	Khylem Progella – Sofiah Shanine Pagara (PHI)	7	6	1
4	Cao Shuting – Dong Jie (beach volleyball) (CHN)	6	4	2
5	Non Matsumoto – Ren Matsumoto (JPN)	4	3	1
5	Merey Kozhakhmet – Laura Kabulbekova (KAZ)	4	3	1
5	Bernadeth Pons – Cherry Ann Rondina (PHI)	4	2	2
5	Patcharaporn Seehawong – Salinda Mungkhon (THA)	5	4	1
9	Wong Man Ching (beach volleyball) – Tsang Ngok Ling (HKG)	4	2	2
9	To Wing Tung – To Wing Man (HKG)	4	2	2
9	Sakura Ito – Mayu Sawame (JPN)	3	2	1
9	Kristina Karimova – Yekaterina Ryukhova (KAZ)	3	1	2
9	Ogulai Kudaikulova – Roza Rasulbek Kyzy (KGZ)	3	1	2
9	Kim Jeonga – Shin Ji-eun (KOR)	3	1	2
9	Nguyễn Lê Thị Tường Vy – Châu Ngọc Lan (VIE)	3	1	2
9	Đinh Thị Mỹ Nga – Mai Hồng Hạnh (VIE)	3	1	2
17	Mst Lucky Khatun – Most Sabina Khatun (BAN)	2	0	2
17	Seo Gaeun – Kim Hyunjoo (KOR)	2	0	2
17	Leong On Ieng – Law Weng Sam (MAC)	2	0	2
17	Goh Yu Heng – Goh Rachael Yu Jie (MAS)	2	0	2
17	Anal Fathimath – Areesha Aminath (MDV)	3	1	2
17	Anudari Erdenesukh – Khatanzaya Purevjargal (MGL)	2	0	2
17	Leyla Bahmanzadeh – Haya Ashraf A Abuissa (QAT)	2	0	2
17	Kasuni Tharuka Lakshani – Chathurika Weerasinghe (SRI)	3	1	2
25	Tsolmon Batjargal – Khandsuren Gantogtokh (MGL)	3	0	3
25	Malak Hashim – Sheqaf Ismail (QAT)	3	0	3
