= Dinesha Prasadani =

Sri Lankan volleyball player

Personal information
- Nationality: (Sri Lanka) Sri Lankan
- Born: November 11, 1987 (age 38); Sri Lanka

Volleyball information
- Position: Universal (indoor volleyball); Defender (beach volleyball)

National team
2011	Sri Lanka (indoor volleyball)
2014	Sri Lanka (beach volleyball)
Honours
Women's Beach Volleyball
Representing Sri Lanka
South Asian Games
Bronze medal – third place	2019 Kathmandu	Beach volleyball

Dinesha Prasadani (born 11 November 1987) is a Sri Lankan volleyball player and beach volleyball player who also currently serves in the Sri Lanka Air Force. She is also the current national captain of the Sri Lanka beach volleyball team.

== Biography ==
She lives at Katupotha in Chilaw. She pursued an early interest in sports from her school days.

== Career ==
She captained Sri Lankan women's volleyball team at the 2016 South Asian Games. She was appointed as the captain of the Sri Lankan women's volleyball team which competed at the 2017 Asian Women's Volleyball Championship where Sri Lanka eventually finished at thirteenth position.

In March 2022, in an exclusive interview with Youth Observer which is a subsidiary newspaper edition of Sunday Observer, she revealed that she took and pursued interest in beach volleyball in 2018. However, records indicate that she has played beach volleyball in national colours as early as around 2014 when she represented Sri Lanka at the 2014 Asian Beach Games and competed in the beach volleyball competition.

She was supposed to represent Sri Lanka at the 2018 Asian Games and which would have guaranteed to make her Asian Games debut. However, only Sri Lankan men's national volleyball team was sent for the 2018 Asian Games as COVID-19 pandemic disrupted women's teams preparations in lead up to the tournament.

She also adjudged as the most valuable player as well as best receiver award in the women's category at the 2018 Munchee National Volleyball Championships and played her part in helping Air Force to win the women's title during the course of the tournament.

She was appointed as the captain of the Sri Lanka beach volleyball team in 2019. She was a key member of the Sri Lankan team which secured bronze medal in the beach volleyball competition at the 2019 South Asian Games. She was part of the Sri Lankan side which took part at the 2021 Asian Beach Volleyball Championships. She was adjudged as the best attacker as well as most valuable player in the women's category during the 2021 Dialog Volleyball Championship and she played a pivotal role in helping Vijaya Sports Club to win the tournament.

She along with Deepika Bandara teamed up and won the 2022 Central Asia Beach Volleyball tournament which was held at the Negombo Beach Park.
