= Xia Xinyi =

Chinese beach volleyball player (born 1997)

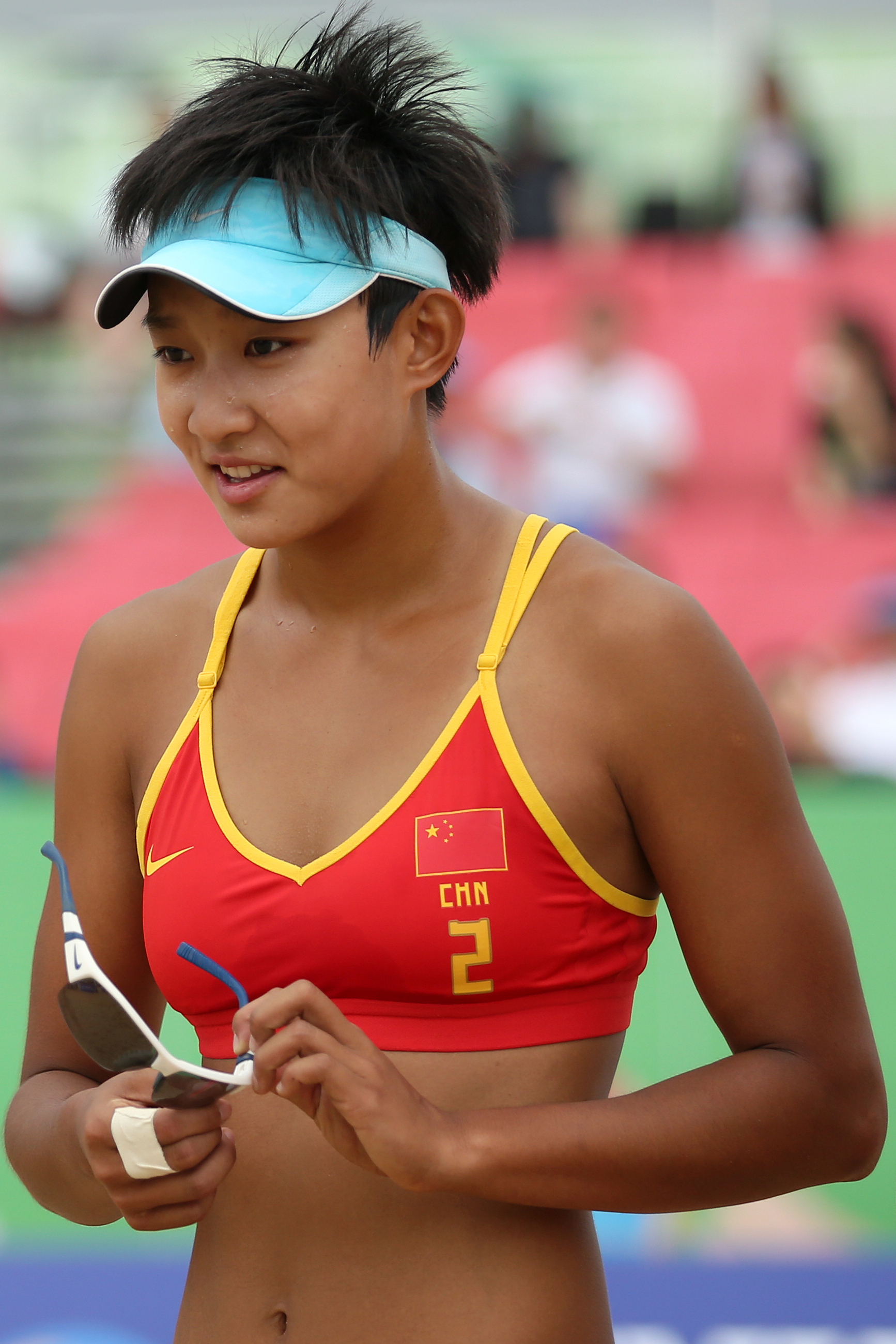
- Xia at the 2014 Asian Games

Personal information
- Nationality: China
- Born: 14 January 1997 (age 29) Ürümqi, China
- Height: 1.82 m (6 ft 0 in)
Honours
Women's beach volleyball
Representing China
Asian Games
Gold medal – first place	2014 Incheon	Women
Gold medal – first place	2018 Jakarta–Palembang	Women
Gold medal – first place	2022 Hangzhou	Women
Silver medal – second place	2026 Aichi–Nagoya	Women
Asian Championships
Gold medal – first place	2016 Sydney	Women
Gold medal – first place	2020 Udon Thani	Women
Gold medal – first place	2023 Fuzhou	Women
Gold medal – first place	2024 Santa Rosa	Women
Silver medal – second place	2019 Maoming	Women
Bronze medal – third place	2014 Jinjiang	Women
Bronze medal – third place	2022 Roi Et	Women

Xia Xinyi (Chinese: 夏欣怡; pinyin: Xià Xīnyí; born 14 January 1997) is a Chinese beach volleyball player. She competed at the 2020 and 2024 Summer Olympics.
