= Khandsuren Gantogtokh =

Mongolian volleyball player

Personal information
- Born: 26 April 1997 (age 29); Ulaanbaatar, Mongolia
- Height: 185 cm (6 ft 1 in)
- Block: 298 cm (117 in)
- Education: Nippon Sport Science University, in Japan

Volleyball information
- Position: Middle blocker
- Current club: (Japan) Tokyo Sunbeams

Career
Years	Teams
2019–2020	(Mongolia) Tenuun-Ogoo Sport Club
2020–2021	(Japan) Breath Hamamatsu
2021–2022	(Taiwan) KingWhale Taipei
2022–2023	(Mongolia) Ulaanbaatar Phoenixeam
2023	(Mongolia) Khuvsgul Seven Stars
2023–2024	(Mongolia) Hobby Ace
2024–2025	(Mongolia) Khashkhan
2025–	(Japan) Tokyo Sunbeams

National team
2015–	Mongolia

Khandsuren "Handa" Gantogtokh (Mongolian: Гантогтохын Хандсүрэн ᠭᠠᠩᠲᠣᠭᠲᠠᠬᠤ ᠶ᠋ᠢᠨ ᠬᠠᠨᠳᠤᠰᠦ᠋ᠷᠦᠩ; born 26 April 1997) is a Mongolian volleyball player.

== Career ==
Khandsuren began her volleyball career with the Mongolian club Tenuun-Ogoo Sport Club, before moving to Japan with She played with Breath Hamamatsu. She played with KingWhale Taipei at the 2022 Premier Volleyball League Invitational Conference, where they came in second. Since 2025, she played with Tokyo Sunbeams in the V.League.

In 2025, she appeared for Team Mongolia on the Netflix competition series Physical: Asia, which premiered on 28 October 2025.

== International career ==
Khandsuren played for the Mongolia women's national volleyball team since 2015. She played with them at the 2023 Asian Women's Club Volleyball Championship and 2023 Asian Women's Volleyball Championship. She also made the 2025 AVC Women's Volleyball Nations Cup.

== Personal life ==
Khandsuren comes from a family of sportsmen, as both her father Bayanmönkhiin Gantogtokh and grandfather Khorloogiin Bayanmönkh were Bökh wrestlers.

== Filmography ==
=== Web shows ===
Year	Title	Role	Notes	Ref.
2025	Physical: Asia	Contestant	Team Mongolia	
