= Dij Rodriguez =

Filipino volleyball player (born 1996)

Personal information
- Full name: Floremel Rodriguez
- Nickname: Dij
- Born: August 29, 1996 (age 30); Dumaguete, Negros Oriental, Philippines
- Education: SWU

Beach volleyball information
Years
  - 2019
  - 2023
  - 2025
Teammate
  - Bernadeth Pons
  - Gen Eslapor
  - Sunny Villapando

Indoor volleyball information
- Position: Opposite Hitter
- Current club: Creamline Cool Smashers
- Number: 4

Career
Years	Teams
2024–present	Creamline Cool Smashers
Honours
Women's volleyball
Representing Philippines
Southeast Asian Games
Gold medal – first place	2025 Thailand	Women's beach
Bronze medal – third place	2021 Vietnam	Women's beach
Bronze medal – third place	2019 Philippines	Women's beach

Floremel "Dij" Rodriguez is a Filipina professional volleyball player. In indoor volleyball, she is an opposite hitter for the Creamline Cool Smashers of the Premier Volleyball League (PVL). She also plays beach volleyball and is a member of the Philippines national beach volleyball team.

== Early life and education ==
Rodriguez was born on August 29, 1996. She attended the Southwestern University (SWU) in Cebu City pursuing a degree in criminology.

== Career ==
=== Beach volleyball ===
Dij Rodriguez represented the SWU Lady Cobras at the beach volleyball tournament of the CESAFI debuting in 2013. She was named CESAFI MVP in 2015. She decided to finished her final year (academic year 2016–17) with SWU.

Petron XCS tapped Rodriguez and Bernadeth Pons for the 2019 Beach Volleyball Challenge Cup of the Philippine Super Liga The pair won Petron's third consecutive title.

Rodriguez partnering with Sunny Villapando, finished as runners-up in the 2025 PNVF Beach Volleyball National Open losing to Sisi Rondina and Pons in the final.

==== National team ====
Rodriguez has represented the Philippines in beach volleyball in the SEA Games. She won two bronze medals in the 2019 and 2021 editions.

At the 2022 Asian Games in Hangzhou, China, Rodriguez paired with Gen Eslapor for the beach volleyball tournament. They finished as quarterfinalists.

=== Indoor volleyball ===
The Creamline Cool Smashers of the Premier Volleyball League signed Rodriguez in February 2024 in the lead up of the 2024 All-Filipino Conference. She filled the role of opposite hitter. This marked Rodriguez's transition from beach volleyball to indoor volleyball.
