= Miki Ishii =

Japanese beach volleyball player (born 1989)

Personal information
- Nationality: Japan
- Born: 7 November 1989 (age 37) Fujisawa, Japan
- Height: 1.72 m (5 ft 8 in)

Sport
- Sport: Beach volleyball
Medal record
Women's beach volleyball
Representing Japan
Asian Games
Silver medal – second place	2018 Jakarta–Palembang	Women
Silver medal – second place	2022 Hangzhou	Women
Asian Championship
Silver medal – second place	2021 Phuket	Women
Bronze medal – third place	2016 Sydney	Women
Bronze medal – third place	2018 Satun	Women
Bronze medal – third place	2020 Udon Thani	Women

For the wrestler, see Miki Ishii.

Miki Ishii (Japanese: 石井美樹, born 7 November 1989) is a Japanese beach volleyball player. She competed in the 2020 Summer Olympics.
