= Sunny Villapando =

Filipino-American beach volleyball player (born 2000)

Personal information
- Full name: Sunnie Kalani Villapando
- Nickname: Sunny
- Born: January 23, 2000 (age 26) Torrance, California, U.S.
- Home town: Manhattan Beach, California
- Education: Stanford; USC
Beach volleyball information
Current teammate
- Years: Teammate
- 2026–: Grydelle Matibag
Honours
Women's volleyball
Representing Philippines
Southeast Asian Games
Gold medal – first place	2025 Thailand	Women's beach

Sunnie Kalani Villapando (born January 23, 2000) is a Filipino American beach volleyball player.

== Early life and education ==
Sunnie Kalani Villapando was born on January 23, 2000, to Roland and Robin Villapando in Torrance, California. However, she considers the city of Manhattan Beach as her hometown. She graduated from the Mira Costa High School in 2017 before pursuing a degree in product design at Stanford University. She pursued graduate studies at the University of Southern California

== Career ==
=== College ===
Villapando played with Stanford Cardinal beach volleyball team from 2018 to 2021. As a graduate school student, she joined the USC Trojans women's beach volleyball team

=== Beach volleyball ===
Villapando partnered with Jenny Gaviola of the Philippine Coast Guard at the 2025 AVC Beach Tour Nuvali Open.

She later played in the 2026 season of the Beach Volleyball Republic in the Philippines. She took part in the 2025 and 2026 seasons.

=== National team ===
Villapando was part of the quartet which won women's beach volleyball gold medal at the 2025 SEA Games in Thailand, breaking the eight title streak of Thailand since the sport was introduced in the SEA Games in 2003.

She paired with Grydelle Matibag for the 2026 Asian Beach Games in Sanya, China.
