= Worapeerachayakorn Kongphopsarutawadee =

Thai beach volleyball player (born 1999)

Personal information
- Born: 20 February 1999 (age 27)
Medal record
Women's beach volleyball
Representing Thailand
Asian Games
Gold medal – first place	2026 Aichi–Nagoya	Women
Asian Beach Games
Gold medal – first place	2026 Sanya	Women
Asian Championships
Gold medal – first place	2021 Phuket	Women
SEA Games
Gold medal – first place	2021 Vietnam	Women's team
Gold medal – first place	2023 Cambodia	Women's team
Silver medal – second place	2025 Thailand	Women's team

Worapeerachayakorn Kongphopsarutawadee (Thai: วรพีรชยากร ก้องภพศรุตาวดี, born 20 February 1999), formerly known as Yodsaphat Pakham (ยศภัทร ปาคำ), is a Thai beach volleyball player. She won the gold medal at the 2021 Asian Championships, 2026 Asian Beach Games, and at the 2026 Asian Games.
