= Khylem Progella =

Filipino beach voleyball player

Personal information
- Born: January 29, 2006 (age 20)
- Hometown: Cebu City, Philippines
- Education: UST

Beach volleyball information

Current teammate
Years	Teammate
2024–	Sofiah Pagara

Previous teammates
Years	Teammate
2022–2023	Grydelle Matibag
Honours
Women's beach volleyball
Representing the Philippines
Asian Games
Bronze medal – third place	2026 Aichi–Nagoya	Women

Khylem Harl Progella is a Filipino beach volleyball player.

== Early life and education ==
Khylem Progella was on born January 29, 2006 and hails from Cebu City. She started volleyball when she was a second grade student at the Labangon Elementary School. She later attended the Southwestern University and University of Southern Philippines Foundation (USPF) in her hometown before moving to the University of Santo Tomas (UST) in Manila.

== Career ==
=== High school ===
Progella played for the USPF Panthers indoor volleyball team and has won two titles in the CESAFI under coach Yolanda Rizarri. She helped the team win a Regional PRISAA title.

She has played for the girls high school beach volleyball team of UST at the University Athletic Association of the Philippines (UAAP). She won the Seasons 85 and 86 girls titles in 2023 and 2024.

=== College ===
Progella made her collegiate beach volleyball debut for the UST Growling Tigers in Seasons 87 in November 2024, teaming up with Sofiah Pagara. Faiing to defend the title in the previous season, the Progella and Pagara pair reclaimed the women's beach volleyball title for UST in Seasons 88 in 2025.

=== National team ===
==== With Grydelle Matibag ====
Khylem Progella has represented the Philippines with Grydelle Matibag as early as the Subic Futures of the 2022 Volleyball World Beach Pro Tour. The duo took part at the women's beach volleyball event of the 2022 Asian Games in Hangzhou, China in September 2023. They reached the Round of 16.

==== With Sofiah Pagara ====
Progella has played with UST teammate Pagara for the Philippines. The pair played at the 2024 Asian Beach Volleyball Championships in Nuvali, Laguna. At the 2026 World Beach Pro Tour, she and Pagara won the Busan Future defeating veterans and compatriots Sisi Rondina and Bernadeth Pons.

Progella and Pagara reached the quarterfinals of the women's beach volleyball event of the 2026 Asian Beach Games in Sanya, China. The pair played again at the women's beach volleyball event of the 2026 Asian Games in Aichi and Nagoya, Japan where they won a bronze medal.
