= Akiko Hasegawa (volleyball) =

Japanese volleyball player (born 1985)

Akiko Uchida

Personal information
- Full name: Akiko Uchida
- Nickname: Kyou
- Born: 30 November 1985 (age 40); Koto, Tokyo, Japan
- Height: 1.73 m (5 ft 8 in)
- Weight: 64 kg (141 lb)
- Spike: 290 cm (114 in)

Volleyball information
- Position: Wing Spiker
- Current club: NEC Red Rockets
- Number: 4

Akiko Hasegawa, née Uchida (内田暁子 Uchida Akiko, born November 30, 1985) is a Japanese volleyball player who plays for NEC Red Rockets.

== Clubs ==
- BunkyoGakuin Univ. High School → AoyamaGakuin Univ. → NEC Red Rockets (2008-)

== National team ==
- The 5th AVC Eastern Zonal Volleyball championships (2006)
- Japan Universiade national team (2007)
