= Taravadee Naraphornrapat =

Thai beach volleyball player (born 1994)

Personal information
- Born: 6 June 1994 (age 32)
Medal record
Women's beach volleyball
Representing Thailand
Asian Games
Gold medal – first place	2026 Aichi–Nagoya	Women
Asian Beach Games
Gold medal – first place	2026 Sanya	Women's team
Asian Championships
Gold medal – first place	2021 Phuket	Women's team
SEA Games
Gold medal – first place	2019 Philippines	Women's team
Gold medal – first place	2021 Vietnam	Women's team
Gold medal – first place	2023 Cambodia	Women's team
Silver medal – second place	2025 Thailand	Women's team

Taravadee Naraphornrapat (Thai: ธาราวดี นาราพรลภัส born 5 June 1994), formerly known as Khanittha Hongpak (ขนิษฐา หงษ์พักตร์), is a Thai beach volleyball player. She won the gold medal at the 2021 Asian Beach Volleyball Championships, 2026 Asian Beach Games, and at the 2026 Asian Games.
