= AVC Beach Volleyball Continental Championships =

Beach volleyball competition

Asian Beach Volleyball Championships
- Status: active
- Genre: Continental Championships; Beach volleyball
- Date: varying
- Frequency: annual
- Country: varying
- Inaugurated: 2000
- Previous event: 2026
- Organiser: Asian Volleyball Confederation
- Website: asianvolleyball.net

The Asian Beach Volleyball Championships is an international beach volleyball competition held every year in Asia and Oceania contested by the double-gender beach volleyball of the members of Asian Volleyball Confederation.

== Men's tournaments ==
=== Summary ===
Year	Host	Gold		Silver		Bronze		Ref
Year	Host	Country	Team	Country	Team	Country	Team	Ref
2000; Details	(China) Yangjiang	NZL	Craig Seuseu; Lefu Leaupepe	INA	Irilkhun Shofanna; Markoji	AUS	Pat Gulline; Shaun Blackman	
2001; Details	(Philippines) Pasay	No Competition For Men's						
2002; Details	(China) Yingkou	NZL	Hayden Jones; Kirk Pitman	KAZ	Dmitriy Vorobyev; Pavel Zabuslayev	CHN	Teng Maomin; Zhao Chicheng	
2004; Details	(China) Lianyungang	CHN	Xu Qiang; Xu Linyin	NZL	Jason Lochhead; Kirk Pitman	KAZ	Oleg Kisselev; Pavel Zabuslayev	
2005; Details	(Thailand) Songkhla	INA	Koko Prasetyo Darkuncoro; Agus Salim	NZL	Jason Lochhead; Kirk Pitman	JPN	Taichi Morikawa; Katsuhiro Shiratori	
2006; Details	(Iran) Kish	INA	Andy Ardiyansah; Koko Prasetyo Darkuncoro	KAZ	Alexandr Dyachenko; Alexey Kulinich	INA	Agus Salim; Supriadi	
2007; Details	(Thailand) Songkhla	INA	Andy Ardiyansah; Koko Prasetyo Darkuncoro	CHN	Gao Fangtian; Han Shengwei	NZL	Greg Lindsay; Russell Watson	
2008; Details	(India) Hyderabad	INA	Andy Ardiyansah; Koko Prasetyo Darkuncoro	CHN	Gao Fangtian; Han Shengwei	THA	Borworn Yungtin; Sataporn Sawangrueang	
2009; Details	(China) Haikou	CHN	Wu Penggen; Xu Linyin	KAZ	Dmitriy Yakovlev; Alexey Kulinich	JPN	Kentaro Asahi; Katsuhiro Shiratori	
2010; Details	(China) Haikou	CHN	Wu Penggen; Xu Linyin	INA	Andy Ardiyansah; Koko Prasetyo Darkuncoro	CHN	Gao Peng; Li Jian	
2011; Details	(China) Haikou	IRI	Parviz Farrokhi; Aghmohammad Salagh	CHN	Xu Linyin; Wu Penggen	KAZ	Alexandr Dyachenko; Alexey Sidorenko	
2012; Details	(China) Haikou	AUS	Isaac Kapa; Chris McHugh	CHN	Chen Cheng; Li Jian	INA	Koko Prasetyo Darkuncoro; Ade Candra Rachmawan	
2013; Details	(China) Wuhan	KAZ	Alexey Sidorenko; Alexandr Dyachenko	THA	Prathip Sukto; Sittichai Sangkhachot	CHN	Abuduhalikejiang Mutailipu; Li Jian	
2014; Details	(China) Jinjiang	AUS	Isaac Kapa; Chris McHugh	KAZ	Dmitriy Yakovlev; Alexey Kuleshov	QAT	Tiago Santos; Jefferson Pereira	
2015; Details	Hong Kong	No Competition For Men's						
2016; Details	(Australia) Sydney	AUS	Isaac Kapa; Chris McHugh	AUS	Bo Soderberg; Cole Durant	AUS	Josh Court; Damien Schumann	
2017; Details	(Thailand) Songkhla	IRI	Rahman Raoufi; Bahman Salemi	INA	Ade Candra Rachmawan; Mohammad Ashfiya	AUS	Chris McHugh; Damien Schumann	
2018; Details	(Thailand) Satun	QAT	Ahmed Tijan; Cherif Younousse	IRI	Bahman Salemi; Arash Vakili	KAZ	Alexey Sidorenko; Alexandr Dyachenko	
2019; Details	(China) Maoming	QAT	Ahmed Tijan; Cherif Younousse	CHN	Gao Peng; Li Yang	CHN	Wu Jiaxin; Abuduhalikejiang Mutailipu	
2020; Details	(Thailand) Udon Thani	AUS	Chris McHugh; Damien Schumann	CHN	Wu Jiaxin; Abuduhalikejiang Mutailipu	AUS	Zachery Schubert; Max Guehrer	
2021; Details	(Thailand) Phuket	AUS	Chris McHugh; Paul Burnett	IRI	Bahman Salemi; Abolhassan Khakizadeh	QAT	Cherif Younousse; Ahmed Tijan	
2022; Details	(Iran) Bandar Abbas	QAT	Cherif Younousse; Ahmed Tijan	AUS	Chris McHugh; Paul Burnett	CHN	Li Zhuoxin; Xue Tao	
2023; Details	(China) Fuzhou	AUS	Thomas Hodges; Zachery Schubert	AUS	Chris McHugh; Paul Burnett	THA	Pithak Tipjan; Poravid Taovato	
2024; Details	(Philippines) Santa Rosa	AUS	D'Artagnan Potts; Jack Pearse	AUS	Mark Nicolaidis; Izac Carracher	IRI	Abbas Pourasgari; Alireza Aghajani	
2026; Details	(China) Shangluo	AUS	Mark Nicolaidis; Izac Carracher	AUS	Thomas Hodges; Ben Hood	CHN	Jiaxin Wu; Chaowei Zhou	

=== Medal table ===
Rank	Nation	Gold	Silver	Bronze	Total
1	Australia	8	5	4	17
2	Indonesia	4	3	2	9
3	China	3	6	6	15
4	Qatar	3	0	2	5
5	Iran	2	2	1	5
5	New Zealand	2	2	1	5
7	Kazakhstan	1	4	3	8
8	Thailand	0	1	2	3
9	Japan	0	0	2	2
Totals (9 entries)		23	23	23	69

== Women's tournaments ==
=== Summary ===
Year	Host	Gold		Silver		Bronze		Ref
Year	Host	Country	Team	Country	Team	Country	Team	Ref
2000; Details	(China) Yangjiang	CHN	Fu Lingli; Lan Hong	CHN	Sun Jing; Han Bo	INA	Eta Kaize; Agustina Sineri	
2001; Details	(Philippines) Pasay	JPN	Chiaki Kusuhara; Ryoko Tokuno	CHN	Pan Wangye; You Wenhui	CHN	Han Bo; Sun Jing	
2002; Details	(China) Yingkou	CHN	Hong Lina; Lin Xianling	THA	Rattanaporn Arlaisuk; Manatsanan Pangka	CHN	Han Bo; Sun Jing	
2004; Details	(China) Lianyungang	CHN	Han Bo; Sun Jing	CHN	Hu Xiaoyan; Zhang Xi	CHN	Ren Zhengqing; Lu Wenfeng	
2005; Details	(Thailand) Songkhla	THA	Kamoltip Kulna; Usa Tenpaksee	THA	Yupa Phokongploy; Jarunee Sannok	JPN	Chiaki Kusuhara; Satoko Urata	
2006; Details	(Iran) Kish	No Competition For Women's						
2007; Details	(Thailand) Songkhla	THA	Kamoltip Kulna; Yupa Phokongpoly	CHN	Yue Yuan; Zhang Wenwen	THA	Jarunee Sannok; Usa Tenpaksee	
2008; Details	(India) Hyderabad	THA	Kamoltip Kulna; Yupa Phokongpoly	CHN	Miao Chenchen; Ji Linjun	THA	Jarunee Sannok; Usa Tenpaksee	
2009; Details	(China) Haikou	CHN	Xue Chen; Zhang Xi	CHN	Jin Jieqiong; Yue Yuan	JPN	Mutsumi Ozaki; Ayumi Kusano	
2010; Details	(China) Haikou	CHN	Xue Chen; Zhang Xi	KAZ	Tatyana Mashkova; Irina Tsimbalova	JPN	Shinako Tanaka; Sayaka Mizoe	
2011; Details	(China) Haikou	CHN	Zhang Xi; Xue Chen	CHN	Zhang Changning; Ma Yuanyuan	AUS	Natalie Cook; Tamsin Hinchley	
2012; Details	(China) Haikou	CHN	Zhang Xi; Xue Chen	VAN	Henriette Iatika; Miller Elwin	CHN	Yue Yuan; Ma Yuanyuan	
2013; Details	(China) Wuhan	CHN	Yue Yuan; Ma Yuanyuan	THA	Varapatsorn Radarong; Tanarattha Udomchavee	KAZ	Tatyana Mashkova; Irina Tsimbalova	
2014; Details	(China) Jinjiang	AUS	Louise Bawden; Taliqua Clancy	THA	Varapatsorn Radarong; Tanarattha Udomchavee	CHN	Xue Chen; Xia Xinyi	
2015; Details	Hong Kong	AUS	Louise Bawden; Taliqua Clancy	VAN	Linline Matauatu; Miller Pata	AUS	Mariafe Artacho del Solar; Nicole Laird	
2016; Details	(Australia) Sydney	CHN	Xue Chen; Xia Xinyi	AUS	Mariafe Artacho del Solar; Nicole Laird	JPN	Miki Ishii; Megumi Murakami	
2017; Details	(Thailand) Songkhla	AUS	Louise Bawden; Taliqua Clancy	CHN	Wang Fan; Yue Yuan	AUS	Phoebe Bell; Nicole Laird	
2018; Details	(Thailand) Satun	AUS	Taliqua Clancy; Mariafe Artacho del Solar	CHN	Wang Fan; Xue Chen	JPN	Miki Ishii; Megumi Murakami	
2019; Details	(China) Maoming	AUS	Taliqua Clancy; Mariafe Artacho del Solar	CHN	Xia Xinyi; Wang Fan	AUS	Phoebe Bell; Jessyka Ngauamo	
2020; Details	(Thailand) Udon Thani	CHN	Wang Fan; Xia Xinyi	CHN	Wang Jingzhe; Wen Shuhui	JPN	Megumi Murakami; Miki Ishii	
2021; Details	(Thailand) Phuket	THA	Taravadee Naraphornrapat; Worapeerachayakorn Kongphopsarutawadee	JPN	Miki Ishii; Sayaka Mizoe	AUS	Phoebe Bell; Georgia Johnson	
2022; Details	(Thailand) Roi Et	NZL	Shaunna Polley; Alice Zeimann	AUS	Taliqua Clancy; Mariafe Artacho del Solar	CHN	Xia Xinyi; Lin Meimei	
2023; Details	(China) Fuzhou	CHN	Xia Xinyi; Xue Chen	THA	Taravadee Naraphornrapat; Worapeerachayakorn Kongphopsarutawadee	CHN	Mushajiang Aheidan; Wang Jingzhe	
2024; Details	(Philippines) Santa Rosa	CHN	Wang Jingzhe; Xia Xinyi	CHN	Xue Chen; Zeng Jinjin	AUS	Jana Milutinovic; Stefanie Fejes	
2026; Details	(China) Shangluo	AUS	Stefanie Fejes; Taliqua Clancy	CHN	Xu Yan; Xia Xinyi	JPN	Asami Shiba; Reika Murakami	

=== Medal table ===
Rank	Nation	Gold	Silver	Bronze	Total
1	China	12	13	7	32
2	Australia	6	2	6	14
3	Thailand	4	5	2	11
4	Japan	1	1	7	9
5	New Zealand	1	0	0	1
6	Vanuatu	0	2	0	2
7	Kazakhstan	0	1	1	2
8	Indonesia	0	0	1	1
Totals (8 entries)		24	24	24	72

== Total medal table ==
Rank	Nation	Gold	Silver	Bronze	Total
1	China	15	19	13	47
2	Australia	14	7	10	31
3	Thailand	4	6	4	14
4	Indonesia	4	3	3	10
5	New Zealand	3	2	1	6
6	Qatar	3	0	2	5
7	Iran	2	2	1	5
8	Kazakhstan	1	5	4	10
9	Japan	1	1	9	11
10	Vanuatu	0	2	0	2
Totals (10 entries)		47	47	47	141
