= 2022 Asian Beach Volleyball Championships =

International beach volleyball competition

- Location: Roi Et, Thailand; Bandar Abbas, Iran
- Dates: 14–17 September 2022; 14–18 November 2022

The following is the final results of the 2002 Asian Beach Volleyball Championship. The men's competition was held in Bandar Abbas, Iran and the women's competition was held in Roi Et, Thailand.

== Medal summary ==
Event	Gold	Silver	Bronze
Men	Qatar; Cherif Younousse; Ahmed Tijan	Australia; Chris McHugh; Paul Burnett	China; Li Zhuoxin; Xue Tao
Women	New Zealand; Shaunna Polley; Alice Zeimann	Australia; Taliqua Clancy; Mariafe Artacho del Solar	China; Xia Xinyi; Lin Meimei

== Participating nations ==
=== Men ===
- Australia (3)
- China (3)
- Hong Kong (2)
- India (1)
- Indonesia (2)
- Iran (4)
- Japan (3)
- Kazakhstan (3)
- Oman (2)
- Qatar (3)
- Thailand (3)

=== Women ===
- Australia (3)
- China (3)
- Chinese Taipei (2)
- Hong Kong (3)
- Japan (3)
- Kazakhstan (2)
- Malaysia (1)
- New Zealand (3)
- Philippines (2)
- Singapore (3)
- Thailand (5)
- Vanuatu (1)
- Vietnam (1)

== Men's tournament ==
=== Preliminary round ===
==== Pool A ====
Pos	Team	Pld	W	L	Pts	SW	SL	SR	SPW	SPL	SPR
1	(Iran) A. Mirzaali–A. Vakili	2	2	0	4	4	0	MAX	84	61	1.377
2	(Qatar) Abdallah–M. Ihab	2	1	1	3	2	2	1.000	76	79	0.962
3	(Japan) Takahashi–Furuta	2	0	2	2	0	4	0.000	67	87	0.770

Source: AVC

Date		Score		Set 1	Set 2	Set 3
14 Nov	Takahashi–Furuta (Japan)	0–2	(Qatar) Abdallah–M. Ihab	15–21	22–24	
15 Nov	A. Mirzaali–A. Vakili (Iran)	2–0	(Qatar) Abdallah–M. Ihab	21–15	21–16	
16 Nov	A. Mirzaali–A. Vakili (Iran)	2–0	(Japan) Takahashi–Furuta	21–11	21–19	

==== Pool B ====
Pos	Team	Pld	W	L	Pts	SW	SL	SR	SPW	SPL	SPR
1	(Qatar) Cherif–Ahmed	2	2	0	4	4	0	MAX	86	58	1.483
2	(Thailand) K. Dunwinit–Intuch	2	1	1	3	2	3	0.667	73	95	0.768
3	(China) Wang Y.W.–Ch.W. Zhou	2	0	2	2	1	4	0.250	90	96	0.938

Source: AVC

Date		Score		Set 1	Set 2	Set 3
14 Nov	K. Dunwinit–Intuch (Thailand)	2–1	(China) Wang Y.W.–Ch.W. Zhou	16–21	21–19	15–13
15 Nov	Cherif–Ahmed (Qatar)	2–0	(China) Wang Y.W.–Ch.W. Zhou	21–16	23–21	
16 Nov	Cherif–Ahmed (Qatar)	2–0	(Thailand) K. Dunwinit–Intuch	21–9	21–12	

==== Pool C ====
Pos	Team	Pld	W	L	Pts	SW	SL	SR	SPW	SPL	SPR
1	(Australia) McHugh–Burnett	2	1	1	3	2	2	1.000	81	79	1.025
2	(Indonesia) Ashfiya–Candra	2	1	1	3	2	3	0.667	90	89	1.011
3	(Japan) Shoji–Ikeda	2	1	1	3	3	2	1.500	90	93	0.968

Source: AVC

Date		Score		Set 1	Set 2	Set 3
14 Nov	Ashfiya–Candra (Indonesia)	2–1	(Japan) Shoji–Ikeda	21–16	18–21	15–10
15 Nov	McHugh–Burnett (Australia)	0–2	(Japan) Shoji–Ikeda	20–22	19–21	
16 Nov	McHugh–Burnett (Australia)	2–0	(Indonesia) Ashfiya–Candra	21–19	21–17	

==== Pool D ====
Pos	Team	Pld	W	L	Pts	SW	SL	SR	SPW	SPL	SPR
1	(Kazakhstan) Yakovlev–Bogatu	3	3	0	6	6	1	6.000	139	111	1.252
2	(Australia) Carracher–Nicolaidis	3	2	1	5	5	2	2.500	136	110	1.236
3	(Oman) Ahmed–Haitham	3	1	2	4	2	4	0.500	103	95	1.084
4	(Hong Kong) K.Y. Wong–K.W. Tse	3	0	3	3	0	6	0.000	64	126	0.508

Source: AVC

Date		Score		Set 1	Set 2	Set 3
14 Nov	Carracher–Nicolaidis (Australia)	2–0	(Hong Kong) K.Y. Wong–K.W. Tse	21–10	21–14	
14 Nov	Ahmed–Haitham (Oman)	0–2	(Kazakhstan) Yakovlev–Bogatu	15–21	15–21	
15 Nov	Carracher–Nicolaidis (Australia)	1–2	(Kazakhstan) Yakovlev–Bogatu	21–17	21–23	10–15
15 Nov	Ahmed–Haitham (Oman)	2–0	(Hong Kong) K.Y. Wong–K.W. Tse	21–7	21–4	
16 Nov	Carracher–Nicolaidis (Australia)	2–0	(Oman) Ahmed–Haitham	21–12	21–19	
16 Nov	Yakovlev–Bogatu (Kazakhstan)	2–0	(Hong Kong) K.Y. Wong–K.W. Tse	21–14	21–15	

==== Pool E ====
Pos	Team	Pld	W	L	Pts	SW	SL	SR	SPW	SPL	SPR
1	(Australia) Schubert–Hodges	3	3	0	6	6	0	MAX	126	83	1.518
2	(Kazakhstan) Pustynnikov–Petrossyants	3	2	1	5	4	4	1.000	144	140	1.029
3	(Indonesia) Danang–Gilang	3	1	2	4	3	4	0.750	114	133	0.857
4	(Japan) Hasegawa–Kurasaka	3	0	3	3	1	6	0.167	112	140	0.800

Source: AVC

Date		Score		Set 1	Set 2	Set 3
14 Nov	Schubert–Hodges (Australia)	2–0	(Kazakhstan) Pustynnikov–Petrossyants	21–13	21–18	
14 Nov	Hasegawa–Kurasaka (Japan)	0–2	(Indonesia) Danang–Gilang	18–21	16–21	
15 Nov	Schubert–Hodges (Australia)	2–0	(Indonesia) Danang–Gilang	21–15	21–12	
15 Nov	Hasegawa–Kurasaka (Japan)	1–2	(Kazakhstan) Pustynnikov–Petrossyants	19–21	22–20	12–15
16 Nov	Schubert–Hodges (Australia)	2–0	(Japan) Hasegawa–Kurasaka	21–13	21–12	
16 Nov	Danang–Gilang (Indonesia)	1–2	(Kazakhstan) Pustynnikov–Petrossyants	23–21	15–21	7–15

==== Pool F ====
Pos	Team	Pld	W	L	Pts	SW	SL	SR	SPW	SPL	SPR
1	(China) Wu Jiaxin–Ha Likejiang	3	3	0	6	6	0	MAX	127	104	1.221
2	(Thailand) T. Pithak–T. Poravid	3	2	1	5	4	2	2.000	119	106	1.123
3	(Iran) Aro–Mehdi	3	1	2	4	2	5	0.400	117	134	0.873
4	(Kazakhstan) Aldash–Gurin	3	0	3	3	1	6	0.167	115	134	0.858

Source: AVC

Date		Score		Set 1	Set 2	Set 3
14 Nov	Wu Jiaxin–Ha Likejiang (China)	2–0	(Iran) Aro–Mehdi	21–18	21–14	
14 Nov	T. Pithak–T. Poravid (Thailand)	2–0	(Kazakhstan) Aldash–Gurin	21–12	21–16	
15 Nov	Wu Jiaxin–Ha Likejiang (China)	2–0	(Kazakhstan) Aldash–Gurin	21–19	21–18	
15 Nov	T. Pithak–T. Poravid (Thailand)	2–0	(Iran) Aro–Mehdi	21–17	21–18	
16 Nov	Wu Jiaxin–Ha Likejiang (China)	2–0	(Thailand) T. Pithak–T. Poravid	21–15	22–20	
16 Nov	Aldash–Gurin (Kazakhstan)	1–2	(Iran) Aro–Mehdi	21–13	20–22	9–15

==== Pool G ====
Pos	Team	Pld	W	L	Pts	SW	SL	SR	SPW	SPL	SPR
1	(Iran) Salemi B.–A. Aghajani	3	3	0	6	6	1	6.000	138	101	1.366
2	(China) Li Zhuoxin–T. Xue	3	2	1	5	4	2	2.000	112	107	1.047
3	(Thailand) J. Surin–N. Banlue	3	1	2	4	3	4	0.750	128	120	1.067
4	(Hong Kong) P.L. Wong–K.F. Lam	3	0	3	3	0	6	0.000	76	126	0.603

Source: AVC

Date		Score		Set 1	Set 2	Set 3
14 Nov	J. Surin–N. Banlue (Thailand)	2–0	(Hong Kong) P.L. Wong–K.F. Lam	21–13	21–10	
14 Nov	Salemi B.–A. Aghajani (Iran)	2–0	(China) Li Zhuoxin–T. Xue	21–13	21–14	
15 Nov	Salemi B.–A. Aghajani (Iran)	2–0	(Hong Kong) P.L. Wong–K.F. Lam	21–15	21–12	
15 Nov	J. Surin–N. Banlue (Thailand)	0–2	(China) Li Zhuoxin–T. Xue	19–21	20–22	
16 Nov	J. Surin–N. Banlue (Thailand)	1–2	(Iran) Salemi B.–A. Aghajani	21–18	19–21	7–15
16 Nov	Li Zhuoxin–T. Xue (China)	2–0	(Hong Kong) P.L. Wong–K.F. Lam	21–13	21–13	

==== Pool H ====
Pos	Team	Pld	W	L	Pts	SW	SL	SR	SPW	SPL	SPR
1	(Iran) S. Shekar–A. Pourasgari	3	3	0	6	6	0	MAX	126	85	1.482
2	(Oman) Mazin–Hood	3	2	1	5	4	2	2.000	113	101	1.119
3	(Qatar) El-Majid–M. Assam	3	1	2	4	2	4	0.500	107	104	1.029
4	(India) Naresh–Raju	3	0	3	3	0	6	0.000	70	126	0.556

Source: AVC

Date		Score		Set 1	Set 2	Set 3
14 Nov	El-Majid–M. Assam (Qatar)	2–0	(India) Naresh–Raju	21–11	21–9	
14 Nov	Mazin–Hood (Oman)	0–2	(Iran) S. Shekar–A. Pourasgari	16–21	13–21	
15 Nov	Mazin–Hood (Oman)	2–0	(India) Naresh–Raju	21–14	21–15	
15 Nov	El-Majid–M. Assam (Qatar)	0–2	(Iran) S. Shekar–A. Pourasgari	19–21	16–21	
16 Nov	S. Shekar–A. Pourasgari (Iran)	2–0	(India) Naresh–Raju	21–11	21–10	
16 Nov	El-Majid–M. Assam (Qatar)	0–2	(Oman) Mazin–Hood	17–21	13–21	

=== Knockout round ===
Round of 16; 17 November
(Iran) A. Mirzaali–A. Vakili	21	20	15
(Thailand) K. Dunwinit–Intuch	13	22	13
(China) Wu Jiaxin–Ha Likejiang	21	12	10
(Oman) Mazin–Hood	19	21	15
(Iran) Salemi B.–A. Aghajani	21	20	13
(Kazakhstan) Pustynnikov–Petrossyants	14	22	15
(Qatar) Abdallah–M. Ihab	18	13
(Australia) McHugh–Burnett	21	21
(Kazakhstan) Yakovlev–Bogatu	19	21	10
(China) Li Zhuoxin–T. Xue	21	13	15
(Indonesia) Ashfiya–Candra	21	21
(Iran) S. Shekar–A. Pourasgari	10	17
(Australia) Schubert–Hodges	21	21
(Thailand) T. Pithak–T. Poravid	12	17
(Australia) Carracher–Nicolaidis	21	13	12
(Qatar) Cherif–Ahmed	17	21	15

Quarterfinals; 17 November
(Iran) A. Mirzaali–A. Vakili	15	21	15
(Oman) Mazin–Hood	21	18	13
(Kazakhstan) Pustynnikov–Petrossyants	14	10
(Australia) McHugh–Burnett	21	21
(China) Li Zhuoxin–T. Xue	21	17	15
(Indonesia) Ashfiya–Candra	15	21	8
(Australia) Schubert–Hodges	21	18	13
(Qatar) Cherif–Ahmed	19	21	15

Semifinals; 18 November
(Iran) A. Mirzaali–A. Vakili	21	18	11
(Australia) McHugh–Burnett	16	21	15
(China) Li Zhuoxin–T. Xue	18	14
(Qatar) Cherif–Ahmed	21	21

Final; 18 November
(Australia) McHugh–Burnett	16	17
(Qatar) Cherif–Ahmed	21	21
3rd place
(Iran) A. Mirzaali–A. Vakili	16	24
(China) Li Zhuoxin–T. Xue	21	26

== Women's tournament ==
=== Preliminary round ===
==== Pool A ====
Pos	Team	Pld	W	L	Pts	SW	SL	SR	SPW	SPL	SPR
1	(Thailand) Naraphornrapat–Worapeerachayakorn	3	3	0	6	6	0	MAX	126	65	1.938
2	(Kazakhstan) Rachenko–Ukolova	3	2	1	5	4	3	1.333	123	103	1.194
3	(Hong Kong) W.Y. Au Yeung–Y.Y. Koo	3	1	2	4	3	4	0.750	110	122	0.902
4	(Singapore) Ang H.Y.–Ng Y.T.C.	3	0	3	3	0	6	0.000	57	126	0.452

Source: AVC

Date		Score		Set 1	Set 2	Set 3
14 Sep	Naraphornrapat–Worapeerachayakorn (Thailand)	2–0	(Singapore) Ang H.Y.–Ng Y.T.C.	21–8	21–6	
14 Sep	W.Y. Au Yeung–Y.Y. Koo (Hong Kong)	1–2	(Kazakhstan) Rachenko–Ukolova	12–21	21–16	13–15
14 Sep	Naraphornrapat–Worapeerachayakorn (Thailand)	2–0	(Kazakhstan) Rachenko–Ukolova	21–16	21–13	
14 Sep	W.Y. Au Yeung–Y.Y. Koo (Hong Kong)	2–0	(Singapore) Ang H.Y.–Ng Y.T.C.	21–10	21–18	
15 Sep	Naraphornrapat–Worapeerachayakorn (Thailand)	2–0	(Hong Kong) W.Y. Au Yeung–Y.Y. Koo	21–9	21–13	
15 Sep	Rachenko–Ukolova (Kazakhstan)	2–0	(Singapore) Ang H.Y.–Ng Y.T.C.	21–5	21–10	

==== Pool B ====
Pos	Team	Pld	W	L	Pts	SW	SL	SR	SPW	SPL	SPR
1	(Australia) Clancy–Mariafe	3	3	0	6	6	0	MAX	129	67	1.925
2	(Japan) Ren–Non	3	2	1	5	4	2	2.000	117	82	1.427
3	(Singapore) Chong E.H.H.–Soh C.H.C.	3	1	2	4	2	4	0.500	83	117	0.709
4	(Chinese Taipei) Li Y.T.–Hsu C.N.	3	0	3	3	0	6	0.000	63	126	0.500

Source: AVC

Date		Score		Set 1	Set 2	Set 3
14 Sep	Clancy–Mariafe (Australia)	2–0	(Chinese Taipei) Li Y.T.–Hsu C.N.	21–6	21–6	
14 Sep	Ren–Non (Japan)	2–0	(Singapore) Chong E.H.H.–Soh C.H.C.	21–6	21–13	
14 Sep	Clancy–Mariafe (Australia)	2–0	(Singapore) Chong E.H.H.–Soh C.H.C.	21–10	21–12	
14 Sep	Ren–Non (Japan)	2–0	(Chinese Taipei) Li Y.T.–Hsu C.N.	21–9	21–9	
15 Sep	Clancy–Mariafe (Australia)	2–0	(Japan) Ren–Non	21–11	24–22	
15 Sep	Chong E.H.H.–Soh C.H.C. (Singapore)	2–0	(Chinese Taipei) Li Y.T.–Hsu C.N.	21–15	21–18	

==== Pool C ====
Pos	Team	Pld	W	L	Pts	SW	SL	SR	SPW	SPL	SPR
1	(Japan) Ishii–Mizoe	3	3	0	6	6	1	6.000	138	85	1.624
2	(Thailand) S. Patcharaporn–B. Jidapa	3	2	1	5	4	3	1.333	130	109	1.193
3	(China) Yuan Lüwen–J. Dong	3	1	2	4	4	4	1.000	137	118	1.161
4	(Malaysia) San–Chong	3	0	3	3	0	6	0.000	33	126	0.262

Source: AVC

Date		Score		Set 1	Set 2	Set 3
14 Sep	Ishii–Mizoe (Japan)	2–0	(Malaysia) San–Chong	21–1	21–3	
14 Sep	Yuan Lüwen–J. Dong (China)	1–2	(Thailand) S. Patcharaporn–B. Jidapa	21–16	19–21	10–15
14 Sep	Ishii–Mizoe (Japan)	2–0	(Thailand) S. Patcharaporn–B. Jidapa	21–17	21–19	
14 Sep	Yuan Lüwen–J. Dong (China)	2–0	(Malaysia) San–Chong	21–3	21–9	
15 Sep	Ishii–Mizoe (Japan)	2–1	(China) Yuan Lüwen–J. Dong	21–14	18–21	15–10
15 Sep	S. Patcharaporn–B. Jidapa (Thailand)	2–0	(Malaysia) San–Chong	21–7	21–10	

==== Pool D ====
Pos	Team	Pld	W	L	Pts	SW	SL	SR	SPW	SPL	SPR
1	(China) X.Y. Xia–M.M. Lin	3	3	0	6	6	0	MAX	126	54	2.333
2	(Philippines) Rondina–Pons	3	2	1	5	4	3	1.333	114	104	1.096
3	(Thailand) Woranatchayakorn–Charanrutwadee	3	1	2	4	3	4	0.750	108	123	0.878
4	(New Zealand) Sadlier–Dickson	3	0	3	3	0	6	0.000	59	126	0.468

Source: AVC

Date		Score		Set 1	Set 2	Set 3
14 Sep	X.Y. Xia–M.M. Lin (China)	2–0	(New Zealand) Sadlier–Dickson	21–3	21–7	
14 Sep	Woranatchayakorn–Charanrutwadee (Thailand)	1–2	(Philippines) Rondina–Pons	15–21	21–15	7–15
14 Sep	X.Y. Xia–M.M. Lin (China)	2–0	(Philippines) Rondina–Pons	21–10	21–11	
14 Sep	Woranatchayakorn–Charanrutwadee (Thailand)	2–0	(New Zealand) Sadlier–Dickson	21–15	21–15	
15 Sep	X.Y. Xia–M.M. Lin (China)	2–0	(Thailand) Woranatchayakorn–Charanrutwadee	21–12	21–11	
15 Sep	Rondina–Pons (Philippines)	2–0	(New Zealand) Sadlier–Dickson	21–11	21–8	

==== Pool E ====
Pos	Team	Pld	W	L	Pts	SW	SL	SR	SPW	SPL	SPR
1	(China) Wang X.X.–J.J. Zeng	3	3	0	6	6	0	MAX	126	83	1.518
2	(Thailand) Ch. Suchinna–S. Apinya	3	2	1	5	4	2	2.000	110	94	1.170
3	(New Zealand) MacDonald–Milton	3	1	2	4	2	4	0.500	96	118	0.814
4	(Chinese Taipei) Hsu Y.C.–Sheng T.H.	3	0	3	3	0	6	0.000	89	126	0.706

Source: AVC

Date		Score		Set 1	Set 2	Set 3
14 Sep	Wang X.X.–J.J. Zeng (China)	2–0	(Chinese Taipei) Hsu Y.C.–Sheng T.H.	21–13	21–14	
14 Sep	MacDonald–Milton (New Zealand)	0–2	(Thailand) Ch. Suchinna–S. Apinya	18–21	6–21	
14 Sep	Wang X.X.–J.J. Zeng (China)	2–0	(Thailand) Ch. Suchinna–S. Apinya	21–13	21–13	
14 Sep	MacDonald–Milton (New Zealand)	2–0	(Chinese Taipei) Hsu Y.C.–Sheng T.H.	21–19	21–15	
15 Sep	Wang X.X.–J.J. Zeng (China)	2–0	(New Zealand) MacDonald–Milton	21–13	21–17	
15 Sep	Ch. Suchinna–S. Apinya (Thailand)	2–0	(Chinese Taipei) Hsu Y.C.–Sheng T.H.	21–13	21–15	

==== Pool F ====
Pos	Team	Pld	W	L	Pts	SW	SL	SR	SPW	SPL	SPR
1	(Australia) Laird–Bell	3	3	0	6	6	0	MAX	126	76	1.658
2	(Vanuatu) Toko–Lawac	3	1	2	4	3	4	0.750	111	125	0.888
3	(Kazakhstan) Kabulbekova–Ivanchenko	3	1	2	4	2	4	0.500	97	117	0.829
4	(Hong Kong) W.L. Ng–Y.K. Lok	3	1	2	4	2	5	0.400	113	129	0.876

Source: AVC

Date		Score		Set 1	Set 2	Set 3
14 Sep	Laird–Bell (Australia)	2–0	(Hong Kong) W.L. Ng–Y.K. Lok	21–17	21–12	
14 Sep	Toko–Lawac (Vanuatu)	2–0	(Kazakhstan) Kabulbekova–Ivanchenko	21–15	21–17	
14 Sep	Laird–Bell (Australia)	2–0	(Kazakhstan) Kabulbekova–Ivanchenko	21–14	21–9	
14 Sep	Toko–Lawac (Vanuatu)	1–2	(Hong Kong) W.L. Ng–Y.K. Lok	21–15	16–21	8–15
15 Sep	Laird–Bell (Australia)	2–0	(Vanuatu) Toko–Lawac	21–14	21–10	
15 Sep	Kabulbekova–Ivanchenko (Kazakhstan)	2–0	(Hong Kong) W.L. Ng–Y.K. Lok	21–16	21–17	

==== Pool G ====
Pos	Team	Pld	W	L	Pts	SW	SL	SR	SPW	SPL	SPR
1	(Japan) Akiko–Yurika	3	3	0	6	6	1	6.000	142	103	1.379
2	(Philippines) Rodriguez–Eslapor	3	1	2	4	4	4	1.000	146	142	1.028
3	(Australia) Stevens–Johnson	3	1	2	4	2	4	0.500	104	114	0.912
4	(Hong Kong) W.T. To–M.C. Wong	3	1	2	4	2	5	0.400	103	136	0.757

Source: AVC

Date		Score		Set 1	Set 2	Set 3
14 Sep	Akiko–Yurika (Japan)	2–0	(Hong Kong) W.T. To–M.C. Wong	21–8	21–13	
14 Sep	Stevens–Johnson (Australia)	0–2	(Philippines) Rodriguez–Eslapor	19–21	13–21	
14 Sep	Akiko–Yurika (Japan)	2–1	(Philippines) Rodriguez–Eslapor	21–16	22–24	15–12
14 Sep	Stevens–Johnson (Australia)	2–0	(Hong Kong) W.T. To–M.C. Wong	21–14	21–16	
15 Sep	Akiko–Yurika (Japan)	2–0	(Australia) Stevens–Johnson	21–16	21–14	
15 Sep	Rodriguez–Eslapor (Philippines)	1–2	(Hong Kong) W.T. To–M.C. Wong	21–16	18–21	13–15

==== Pool H ====
Pos	Team	Pld	W	L	Pts	SW	SL	SR	SPW	SPL	SPR
1	(New Zealand) Polley–Zeimann	3	3	0	6	6	1	6.000	140	91	1.538
2	(Vietnam) V.N.L. Nguyên–N.L.T.T. Vy	3	2	1	5	5	3	1.667	144	140	1.029
3	(Thailand) Radarong–Numwong	3	1	2	4	3	4	0.750	125	114	1.096
4	(Singapore) Tan A.K.Y.–Beh S.J.H.	3	0	3	3	0	6	0.000	62	126	0.492

Source: AVC

Date		Score		Set 1	Set 2	Set 3
14 Sep	Polley–Zeimann (New Zealand)	2–0	(Singapore) Tan A.K.Y.–Beh S.J.H.	21–9	21–9	
14 Sep	Radarong–Numwong (Thailand)	1–2	(Vietnam) V.N.L. Nguyên–N.L.T.T. Vy	21–18	23–25	10–15
14 Sep	Polley–Zeimann (New Zealand)	2–1	(Vietnam) V.N.L. Nguyên–N.L.T.T. Vy	21–11	20–22	15–11
14 Sep	Radarong–Numwong (Thailand)	2–0	(Singapore) Tan A.K.Y.–Beh S.J.H.	21–5	21–9	
15 Sep	Polley–Zeimann (New Zealand)	2–0	(Thailand) Radarong–Numwong	21–17	21–12	
15 Sep	V.N.L. Nguyên–N.L.T.T. Vy (Vietnam)	2–0	(Singapore) Tan A.K.Y.–Beh S.J.H.	21–11	21–19	

=== Knockout round ===
Round of 16; 15 September
(Thailand) Naraphornrapat–Worapeerachayakorn	21	21
(Philippines) Rodriguez–Eslapor	7	14
(Kazakhstan) Rachenko–Ukolova	11	13
(New Zealand) Polley–Zeimann	21	21
(China) Wang X.X.–J.J. Zeng	21	21
(Vanuatu) Toko–Lawac	15	9
(Vietnam) V.N.L. Nguyên–N.L.T.T. Vy	9	12
(China) X.Y. Xia–M.M. Lin	21	21
(Japan) Ishii–Mizoe	21	21
(Thailand) Ch. Suchinna–S. Apinya	16	13
(Thailand) S. Patcharaporn–B. Jidapa	13	16
(Australia) Laird–Bell	21	21
(Japan) Akiko–Yurika	14	21	15
(Japan) Ren–Non	21	19	9
(Philippines) Rondina–Pons	16	17
(Australia) Clancy–Mariafe	21	21

Quarterfinals; 16 September
(Thailand) Naraphornrapat–Worapeerachayakorn	16	22
(New Zealand) Polley–Zeimann	21	24
(China) Wang X.X.–J.J. Zeng	17	19
(China) X.Y. Xia–M.M. Lin	21	21
(Japan) Ishii–Mizoe	21	21
(Australia) Laird–Bell	17	18
(Japan) Akiko–Yurika	15	11
(Australia) Clancy–Mariafe	21	21

Semifinals; 16 September
(New Zealand) Polley–Zeimann	21	21
(China) X.Y. Xia–M.M. Lin	19	15
(Japan) Ishii–Mizoe	27	16
(Australia) Clancy–Mariafe	29	21

Final; 17 September
(New Zealand) Polley–Zeimann	21	26
(Australia) Clancy–Mariafe	18	24
3rd place
(China) X.Y. Xia–M.M. Lin	21	21
(Japan) Ishii–Mizoe	17	15
