= 2019 Asian Beach Volleyball Championships =

Beach Volleyball Competition

- Location: Maoming, China
- Dates: 9–12 May 2019

The 2019 Asian Beach Volleyball Championship was a beach volleyball event, that was held from 9 to 12 May, 2019 in Maoming, China.

== Medal summary ==
| Event | Gold | Silver | Bronze |
|---|---|---|---|
| Men | Qatar; Ahmed Tijan; Cherif Younousse | China; Gao Peng; Li Yang | China; Wu Jiaxin; Abuduhalikejiang Mutailipu |
| Women | Australia; Taliqua Clancy; Mariafe Artacho del Solar | China; Xia Xinyi; Wang Fan | Australia; Phoebe Bell; Jessyka Ngauamo |

== Participating nations ==
=== Men ===
- Australia (3)
- China (4)
- Chinese Taipei (2)
- Hong Kong (3)
- Iran (2)
- Japan (3)
- Kazakhstan (2)
- New Zealand (2)
- Qatar (1)
- Singapore (1)
- Thailand (2)

=== Women ===
- Australia (3)
- China (4)
- Chinese Taipei (2)
- Hong Kong (2)
- Japan (3)
- Kazakhstan (1)
- New Zealand (2)
- Singapore (1)
- Thailand (3)
- Vanuatu (1)

== Men's tournament ==
=== Preliminary round ===
==== Pool A ====
| Pos | Team | Pld | W | L | Pts | SW | SL | SR | SPW | SPL | SPR |
|---|---|---|---|---|---|---|---|---|---|---|---|
| 1 | (China) P. Gao–Y. Li | 2 | 2 | 0 | 4 | 4 | 1 | 4.000 | 96 | 80 | 1.200 |
| 2 | (Australia) Burnett–Guehrer | 2 | 1 | 1 | 3 | 3 | 3 | 1.000 | 105 | 102 | 1.029 |
| 3 | (Chinese Taipei) Wang C.J.–Hsieh Y.J. | 2 | 0 | 2 | 2 | 1 | 4 | 0.250 | 77 | 96 | 0.802 |

Source: AVC

| Date | | Score | | Set 1 | Set 2 | Set 3 |
|---|---|---|---|---|---|---|
| 09 May | Burnett–Guehrer (Australia) | 2–1 | (Chinese Taipei) Wang C.J.–Hsieh Y.J. | 21–18 | 18–21 | 15–9 |
| 09 May | P. Gao–Y. Li (China) | 2–0 | (Chinese Taipei) Wang C.J.–Hsieh Y.J. | 21–16 | 21–13 | |
| 10 May | P. Gao–Y. Li (China) | 2–1 | (Australia) Burnett–Guehrer | 21–17 | 18–21 | 15–13 |

==== Pool B ====
| Pos | Team | Pld | W | L | Pts | SW | SL | SR | SPW | SPL | SPR |
|---|---|---|---|---|---|---|---|---|---|---|---|
| 1 | (Qatar) Ahmed–Cherif | 2 | 2 | 0 | 4 | 4 | 0 | MAX | 84 | 63 | 1.333 |
| 2 | (Japan) Ikeda–Shiratori | 2 | 1 | 1 | 3 | 2 | 3 | 0.667 | 80 | 94 | 0.851 |
| 3 | (New Zealand) Nicklin–Hartles | 2 | 0 | 2 | 2 | 1 | 4 | 0.250 | 82 | 89 | 0.921 |

Source: AVC

| Date | | Score | | Set 1 | Set 2 | Set 3 |
|---|---|---|---|---|---|---|
| 09 May | Nicklin–Hartles (New Zealand) | 1–2 | (Japan) Ikeda–Shiratori | 17–21 | 21–10 | 14–16 |
| 09 May | Ahmed–Cherif (Qatar) | 2–0 | (Japan) Ikeda–Shiratori | 21–18 | 21–15 | |
| 10 May | Ahmed–Cherif (Qatar) | 2–0 | (New Zealand) Nicklin–Hartles | 21–17 | 21–13 | |

==== Pool C ====
| Pos | Team | Pld | W | L | Pts | SW | SL | SR | SPW | SPL | SPR |
|---|---|---|---|---|---|---|---|---|---|---|---|
| 1 | (China) Wu Jiaxin–Ha Likejiang | 2 | 2 | 0 | 4 | 4 | 0 | MAX | 84 | 57 | 1.474 |
| 2 | (Kazakhstan) Yakovlev–Bogatu | 2 | 1 | 1 | 3 | 2 | 2 | 1.000 | 71 | 63 | 1.127 |
| 3 | (Singapore) Tay Z.H.K.–T. Tan | 2 | 0 | 2 | 2 | 0 | 4 | 0.000 | 49 | 84 | 0.583 |

Source: AVC

| Date | | Score | | Set 1 | Set 2 | Set 3 |
|---|---|---|---|---|---|---|
| 09 May | Yakovlev–Bogatu (Kazakhstan) | 2–0 | (Singapore) Tay Z.H.K.–T. Tan | 21–11 | 21–10 | |
| 09 May | Wu Jiaxin–Ha Likejiang (China) | 2–0 | (Singapore) Tay Z.H.K.–T. Tan | 21–16 | 21–12 | |
| 10 May | Wu Jiaxin–Ha Likejiang (China) | 2–0 | (Kazakhstan) Yakovlev–Bogatu | 21–10 | 21–19 | |

==== Pool D ====
| Pos | Team | Pld | W | L | Pts | SW | SL | SR | SPW | SPL | SPR |
|---|---|---|---|---|---|---|---|---|---|---|---|
| 1 | (Australia) Durant–Schumann | 2 | 2 | 0 | 4 | 4 | 0 | MAX | 84 | 60 | 1.400 |
| 2 | (Chinese Taipei) Hsu C.W.–Wu S.S. | 2 | 1 | 1 | 3 | 2 | 2 | 1.000 | 73 | 78 | 0.936 |
| 3 | (Thailand) N. Kangkon–K. Adisorn | 2 | 0 | 2 | 2 | 0 | 4 | 0.000 | 65 | 84 | 0.774 |

Source: AVC

| Date | | Score | | Set 1 | Set 2 | Set 3 |
|---|---|---|---|---|---|---|
| 09 May | N. Kangkon–K. Adisorn (Thailand) | 0–2 | (Chinese Taipei) Hsu C.W.–Wu S.S. | 18–21 | 18–21 | |
| 09 May | Durant–Schumann (Australia) | 2–0 | (Chinese Taipei) Hsu C.W.–Wu S.S. | 21–14 | 21–17 | |
| 10 May | Durant–Schumann (Australia) | 2–0 | (Thailand) N. Kangkon–K. Adisorn | 21–11 | 21–18 | |

==== Pool E ====
| Pos | Team | Pld | W | L | Pts | SW | SL | SR | SPW | SPL | SPR |
|---|---|---|---|---|---|---|---|---|---|---|---|
| 1 | (Australia) McHugh–Schubert | 2 | 2 | 0 | 4 | 4 | 0 | MAX | 84 | 57 | 1.474 |
| 2 | (Kazakhstan) Dyachenko–Sidorenko | 2 | 1 | 1 | 3 | 2 | 2 | 1.000 | 75 | 72 | 1.042 |
| 3 | (Hong Kong) Lam–Chui | 2 | 0 | 2 | 2 | 0 | 4 | 0.000 | 54 | 84 | 0.643 |

Source: AVC

| Date | | Score | | Set 1 | Set 2 | Set 3 |
|---|---|---|---|---|---|---|
| 09 May | Dyachenko–Sidorenko (Kazakhstan) | 2–0 | (Hong Kong) Lam–Chui | 21–19 | 21–11 | |
| 09 May | McHugh–Schubert (Australia) | 2–0 | (Hong Kong) Lam–Chui | 21–15 | 21–9 | |
| 10 May | McHugh–Schubert (Australia) | 2–0 | (Kazakhstan) Dyachenko–Sidorenko | 21–17 | 21–16 | |

==== Pool F ====
| Pos | Team | Pld | W | L | Pts | SW | SL | SR | SPW | SPL | SPR |
|---|---|---|---|---|---|---|---|---|---|---|---|
| 1 | (Iran) Raoufi R.–A. Mirzaali | 2 | 2 | 0 | 4 | 4 | 1 | 4.000 | 95 | 77 | 1.234 |
| 2 | (New Zealand) O'Dea–Timmer | 2 | 1 | 1 | 3 | 3 | 2 | 1.500 | 93 | 88 | 1.057 |
| 3 | (Japan) Ageba–Tsuchiya | 2 | 0 | 2 | 2 | 0 | 4 | 0.000 | 61 | 84 | 0.726 |

Source: AVC

| Date | | Score | | Set 1 | Set 2 | Set 3 |
|---|---|---|---|---|---|---|
| 09 May | Ageba–Tsuchiya (Japan) | 0–2 | (New Zealand) O'Dea–Timmer | 18–21 | 17–21 | |
| 09 May | Raoufi R.–A. Mirzaali (Iran) | 2–1 | (New Zealand) O'Dea–Timmer | 21–17 | 17–21 | 15–13 |
| 10 May | Raoufi R.–A. Mirzaali (Iran) | 2–0 | (Japan) Ageba–Tsuchiya | 21–17 | 21–9 | |

==== Pool G ====
| Pos | Team | Pld | W | L | Pts | SW | SL | SR | SPW | SPL | SPR |
|---|---|---|---|---|---|---|---|---|---|---|---|
| 1 | (China) T.Y. Yan–J. Li | 3 | 3 | 0 | 6 | 6 | 0 | MAX | 126 | 86 | 1.465 |
| 2 | (Iran) Salemi B.–A. Vakili | 3 | 2 | 1 | 5 | 4 | 3 | 1.333 | 125 | 111 | 1.126 |
| 3 | (Thailand) J. Surin–N. Banlue | 3 | 1 | 2 | 4 | 3 | 4 | 0.750 | 120 | 112 | 1.071 |
| 4 | (Hong Kong) C.H. Cheung–Yip | 3 | 0 | 3 | 3 | 0 | 6 | 0.000 | 64 | 126 | 0.508 |

Source: AVC

| Date | | Score | | Set 1 | Set 2 | Set 3 |
|---|---|---|---|---|---|---|
| 09 May | Salemi B.–A. Vakili (Iran) | 2–0 | (Hong Kong) C.H. Cheung–Yip | 21–9 | 21–12 | |
| 09 May | J. Surin–N. Banlue (Thailand) | 0–2 | (China) T.Y. Yan–J. Li | 16–21 | 14–21 | |
| 09 May | Salemi B.–A. Vakili (Iran) | 0–2 | (China) T.Y. Yan–J. Li | 15–21 | 15–21 | |
| 09 May | J. Surin–N. Banlue (Thailand) | 2–0 | (Hong Kong) C.H. Cheung–Yip | 21–9 | 21–8 | |
| 10 May | Salemi B.–A. Vakili (Iran) | 2–1 | (Thailand) J. Surin–N. Banlue | 17–21 | 21–15 | 15–12 |
| 10 May | T.Y. Yan–J. Li (China) | 2–0 | (Hong Kong) C.H. Cheung–Yip | 21–12 | 21–14 | |

==== Pool H ====
| Pos | Team | Pld | W | L | Pts | SW | SL | SR | SPW | SPL | SPR |
|---|---|---|---|---|---|---|---|---|---|---|---|
| 1 | (China) Li Zhuoxin–Ch.W. Zhou | 2 | 2 | 0 | 4 | 4 | 0 | MAX | 88 | 67 | 1.313 |
| 2 | (Japan) Takahashi–Hasegawa | 2 | 1 | 1 | 3 | 2 | 2 | 1.000 | 84 | 66 | 1.273 |
| 3 | (Hong Kong) Wong–Pong | 2 | 0 | 2 | 2 | 0 | 4 | 0.000 | 45 | 84 | 0.536 |

Source: AVC

| Date | | Score | | Set 1 | Set 2 | Set 3 |
|---|---|---|---|---|---|---|
| 09 May | Li Zhuoxin–Ch.W. Zhou (China) | 2–0 | (Hong Kong) Wong–Pong | 21–16 | 21–9 | |
| 09 May | Takahashi–Hasegawa (Japan) | 2–0 | (Hong Kong) Wong–Pong | 21–9 | 21–11 | |
| 10 May | Takahashi–Hasegawa (Japan) | 0–2 | (China) Li Zhuoxin–Ch.W. Zhou | 20–22 | 22–24 | |

=== Knockout round ===
Round of 16; 10 May
(China) P. Gao–Y. Li | 21 | 21
(Chinese Taipei) Hsu C.W.–Wu S.S. | 12 | 15
(China) Li Zhuoxin–Ch.W. Zhou | 13 | 24 | 18
(Kazakhstan) Dyachenko–Sidorenko | 21 | 22 | 16
(Iran) Raoufi R.–A. Mirzaali | 21 | 21
(Australia) Burnett–Guehrer | 18 | 12
(Australia) Durant–Schumann | 21 | 21
(New Zealand) O'Dea–Timmer | 18 | 17
(China) Wu Jiaxin–Ha Likejiang | 21 | 24
(Iran) Salemi B.–A. Vakili | 19 | 22
(Australia) McHugh–Schubert | 21 | 21
(Japan) Takahashi–Hasegawa | 11 | 19
(China) T.Y. Yan–J. Li | 21 | 21
(Japan) Ikeda–Shiratori | 17 | 15
(Qatar) Ahmed–Cherif | 21 | 21
(Kazakhstan) Yakovlev–Bogatu | 12 | 12

Quarterfinals; 11 May
(China) P. Gao–Y. Li | 21 | 21
(China) Li Zhuoxin–Ch.W. Zhou | 15 | 13
(Iran) Raoufi R.–A. Mirzaali | 18 | 21 | 10
(Australia) Durant–Schumann | 21 | 16 | 15
(China) Wu Jiaxin–Ha Likejiang | 21 | 9 | 15
(Australia) McHugh–Schubert | 10 | 21 | 12
(China) T.Y. Yan–J. Li | 13 | 12
(Qatar) Ahmed–Cherif | 21 | 21

Semifinals; 11 May
(China) P. Gao–Y. Li | 21 | 21
(Australia) Durant–Schumann | 13 | 14
(China) Wu Jiaxin–Ha Likejiang | 16 | 12
(Qatar) Ahmed–Cherif | 21 | 21

Final; 12 May
(China) P. Gao–Y. Li | 13 | 18
(Qatar) Ahmed–Cherif | 21 | 21
3rd place
(Australia) Durant–Schumann | 19 | 16
(China) Wu Jiaxin–Ha Likejiang | 21 | 21

== Women's tournament ==
=== Preliminary round ===
==== Pool A ====
| Pos | Team | Pld | W | L | Pts | SW | SL | SR | SPW | SPL | SPR |
|---|---|---|---|---|---|---|---|---|---|---|---|
| 1 | (China) X.Y. Xia–Wang | 2 | 2 | 0 | 4 | 4 | 0 | MAX | 85 | 64 | 1.328 |
| 2 | (Australia) Laird–Palmer | 2 | 1 | 1 | 3 | 2 | 2 | 1.000 | 70 | 75 | 0.933 |
| 3 | (New Zealand) Kirwan–MacDonald | 2 | 0 | 2 | 2 | 0 | 4 | 0.000 | 69 | 85 | 0.812 |

Source: AVC

| Date | | Score | | Set 1 | Set 2 | Set 3 |
|---|---|---|---|---|---|---|
| 09 May | Laird–Palmer (Australia) | 2–0 | (New Zealand) Kirwan–MacDonald | 21–15 | 21–18 | |
| 09 May | X.Y. Xia–Wang (China) | 2–0 | (New Zealand) Kirwan–MacDonald | 21–16 | 22–20 | |
| 10 May | X.Y. Xia–Wang (China) | 2–0 | (Australia) Laird–Palmer | 21–15 | 21–13 | |

==== Pool B ====
| Pos | Team | Pld | W | L | Pts | SW | SL | SR | SPW | SPL | SPR |
|---|---|---|---|---|---|---|---|---|---|---|---|
| 1 | (Australia) Clancy–Artacho del Solar | 2 | 2 | 0 | 4 | 4 | 1 | 4.000 | 89 | 67 | 1.328 |
| 2 | (Vanuatu) Toko–Pata | 2 | 1 | 1 | 3 | 2 | 3 | 0.667 | 79 | 95 | 0.832 |
| 3 | (China) J.J. Zeng–M.M. Lin | 2 | 0 | 2 | 2 | 2 | 4 | 0.500 | 98 | 104 | 0.942 |

Source: AVC

| Date | | Score | | Set 1 | Set 2 | Set 3 |
|---|---|---|---|---|---|---|
| 09 May | Toko–Pata (Vanuatu) | 2–1 | (China) J.J. Zeng–M.M. Lin | 19–21 | 23–21 | 15–11 |
| 09 May | Clancy–Artacho del Solar (Australia) | 2–1 | (China) J.J. Zeng–M.M. Lin | 21–14 | 11–21 | 15–10 |
| 10 May | Clancy–Artacho del Solar (Australia) | 2–0 | (Vanuatu) Toko–Pata | 21–10 | 21–12 | |

==== Pool C ====
| Pos | Team | Pld | W | L | Pts | SW | SL | SR | SPW | SPL | SPR |
|---|---|---|---|---|---|---|---|---|---|---|---|
| 1 | (Australia) Bell–Ngauamo | 3 | 3 | 0 | 6 | 6 | 1 | 6.000 | 141 | 112 | 1.259 |
| 2 | (Japan) Ishii–Murakami | 3 | 2 | 1 | 5 | 4 | 2 | 2.000 | 125 | 91 | 1.374 |
| 3 | (China) B. Bai–Yuan Lüwen | 3 | 1 | 2 | 4 | 3 | 4 | 0.750 | 110 | 109 | 1.009 |
| 4 | (Chinese Taipei) Kung S.W.–Yeh H.T. | 3 | 0 | 3 | 3 | 0 | 6 | 0.000 | 62 | 126 | 0.492 |

Source: AVC

| Date | | Score | | Set 1 | Set 2 | Set 3 |
|---|---|---|---|---|---|---|
| 09 May | Ishii–Murakami (Japan) | 2–0 | (Chinese Taipei) Kung S.W.–Yeh H.T. | 21–10 | 21–7 | |
| 09 May | Bell–Ngauamo (Australia) | 2–1 | (China) B. Bai–Yuan Lüwen | 14–21 | 21–16 | 15–6 |
| 09 May | Ishii–Murakami (Japan) | 2–0 | (China) B. Bai–Yuan Lüwen | 21–17 | 21–8 | |
| 09 May | Bell–Ngauamo (Australia) | 2–0 | (Chinese Taipei) Kung S.W.–Yeh H.T. | 21–17 | 21–11 | |
| 10 May | B. Bai–Yuan Lüwen (China) | 2–0 | (Chinese Taipei) Kung S.W.–Yeh H.T. | 21–7 | 21–10 | |
| 10 May | Ishii–Murakami (Japan) | 0–2 | (Australia) Bell–Ngauamo | 26–28 | 15–21 | |

==== Pool D ====
| Pos | Team | Pld | W | L | Pts | SW | SL | SR | SPW | SPL | SPR |
|---|---|---|---|---|---|---|---|---|---|---|---|
| 1 | (China) Xue–Wang X.X. | 3 | 3 | 0 | 6 | 6 | 1 | 6.000 | 138 | 112 | 1.232 |
| 2 | (Chinese Taipei) Kou N.H.–Liu P.H. | 3 | 2 | 1 | 5 | 5 | 2 | 2.500 | 138 | 87 | 1.586 |
| 3 | (Thailand) Chanthira–Yodsaphat | 3 | 1 | 2 | 4 | 2 | 4 | 0.500 | 86 | 110 | 0.782 |
| 4 | (Hong Kong) W.T. To–C.Y. Kong | 3 | 0 | 3 | 3 | 0 | 6 | 0.000 | 75 | 128 | 0.586 |

Source: AVC

| Date | | Score | | Set 1 | Set 2 | Set 3 |
|---|---|---|---|---|---|---|
| 09 May | Xue–Wang X.X. (China) | 2–0 | (Hong Kong) W.T. To–C.Y. Kong | 23–21 | 21–12 | |
| 09 May | Kou N.H.–Liu P.H. (Chinese Taipei) | 2–0 | (Thailand) Chanthira–Yodsaphat | 21–9 | 21–10 | |
| 09 May | Xue–Wang X.X. (China) | 2–0 | (Thailand) Chanthira–Yodsaphat | 21–13 | 21–12 | |
| 09 May | Kou N.H.–Liu P.H. (Chinese Taipei) | 2–0 | (Hong Kong) W.T. To–C.Y. Kong | 21–9 | 21–7 | |
| 10 May | Chanthira–Yodsaphat (Thailand) | 2–0 | (Hong Kong) W.T. To–C.Y. Kong | 21–16 | 21–10 | |
| 10 May | Xue–Wang X.X. (China) | 2–1 | (Chinese Taipei) Kou N.H.–Liu P.H. | 14–21 | 23–21 | 15–12 |

==== Pool E ====
| Pos | Team | Pld | W | L | Pts | SW | SL | SR | SPW | SPL | SPR |
|---|---|---|---|---|---|---|---|---|---|---|---|
| 1 | (Kazakhstan) Mashkova–Tsimbalova | 3 | 3 | 0 | 6 | 6 | 1 | 6.000 | 137 | 117 | 1.171 |
| 2 | (Thailand) Radarong–Hongpak | 3 | 2 | 1 | 5 | 4 | 2 | 2.000 | 119 | 91 | 1.308 |
| 3 | (Japan) Mizoe–Hashimoto | 3 | 1 | 2 | 4 | 3 | 4 | 0.750 | 115 | 118 | 0.975 |
| 4 | (Hong Kong) W.Y. Au Yeung–Koo | 3 | 0 | 3 | 3 | 0 | 6 | 0.000 | 81 | 126 | 0.643 |

Source: AVC

| Date | | Score | | Set 1 | Set 2 | Set 3 |
|---|---|---|---|---|---|---|
| 09 May | Radarong–Hongpak (Thailand) | 0–2 | (Kazakhstan) Mashkova–Tsimbalova | 17–21 | 18–21 | |
| 09 May | Mizoe–Hashimoto (Japan) | 2–0 | (Hong Kong) W.Y. Au Yeung–Koo | 21–16 | 21–7 | |
| 09 May | Radarong–Hongpak (Thailand) | 2–0 | (Hong Kong) W.Y. Au Yeung–Koo | 21–17 | 21–11 | |
| 09 May | Mizoe–Hashimoto (Japan) | 1–2 | (Kazakhstan) Mashkova–Tsimbalova | 21–23 | 21–15 | 10–15 |
| 10 May | W.Y. Au Yeung–Koo (Hong Kong) | 0–2 | (Kazakhstan) Mashkova–Tsimbalova | 14–21 | 16–21 | |
| 10 May | Radarong–Hongpak (Thailand) | 2–0 | (Japan) Mizoe–Hashimoto | 21–13 | 21–8 | |

==== Pool F ====
| Pos | Team | Pld | W | L | Pts | SW | SL | SR | SPW | SPL | SPR |
|---|---|---|---|---|---|---|---|---|---|---|---|
| 1 | (Thailand) Udomchavee–Numwong | 3 | 3 | 0 | 6 | 6 | 0 | MAX | 129 | 91 | 1.418 |
| 2 | (Japan) Take–Kusano | 3 | 2 | 1 | 5 | 4 | 3 | 1.333 | 134 | 108 | 1.241 |
| 3 | (New Zealand) Tilley–Polley | 3 | 1 | 2 | 4 | 3 | 4 | 0.750 | 126 | 130 | 0.969 |
| 4 | (Singapore) E. Chong–Lau E.S. | 3 | 0 | 3 | 3 | 0 | 6 | 0.000 | 66 | 126 | 0.524 |

Source: AVC

| Date | | Score | | Set 1 | Set 2 | Set 3 |
|---|---|---|---|---|---|---|
| 09 May | Take–Kusano (Japan) | 2–1 | (New Zealand) Tilley–Polley | 24–26 | 21–15 | 15–8 |
| 09 May | Udomchavee–Numwong (Thailand) | 2–0 | (Singapore) E. Chong–Lau E.S. | 21–10 | 21–14 | |
| 09 May | Take–Kusano (Japan) | 2–0 | (Singapore) E. Chong–Lau E.S. | 21–9 | 21–8 | |
| 09 May | Udomchavee–Numwong (Thailand) | 2–0 | (New Zealand) Tilley–Polley | 24–22 | 21–13 | |
| 10 May | E. Chong–Lau E.S. (Singapore) | 0–2 | (New Zealand) Tilley–Polley | 13–21 | 12–21 | |
| 10 May | Take–Kusano (Japan) | 0–2 | (Thailand) Udomchavee–Numwong | 14–21 | 18–21 | |

=== Knockout round ===
Round of 16; 10 May
(China) X.Y. Xia–Wang | 21 | 22
(New Zealand) Tilley–Polley | 19 | 20
(Japan) Ishii–Murakami | 21 | 21
(Chinese Taipei) Kou N.H.–Liu P.H. | 14 | 12
(Thailand) Udomchavee–Numwong | 19 | 22
(Vanuatu) Toko–Pata | 21 | 24
(China) Xue–Wang X.X. | 21 | 21
(Japan) Mizoe–Hashimoto | 16 | 15
(Australia) Bell–Ngauamo | 21 | 21
(China) J.J. Zeng–M.M. Lin | 13 | 16
(Kazakhstan) Mashkova–Tsimbalova | 21 | 23
(Japan) Take–Kusano | 15 | 21
(Australia) Laird–Palmer | 22 | 21
(Thailand) Radarong–Hongpak | 20 | 18
(Australia) Clancy–Artacho del Solar | 21 | 21
(New Zealand) Kirwan–MacDonald | 11 | 10

Quarterfinals; 11 May
(China) X.Y. Xia–Wang | 22 | 21
(Japan) Ishii–Murakami | 20 | 14
(Vanuatu) Toko–Pata | 21 | 21
(China) Xue–Wang X.X. | 17 | 19
(Australia) Bell–Ngauamo | 22 | 19 | 15
(Kazakhstan) Mashkova–Tsimbalova | 20 | 21 | 9
(Australia) Laird–Palmer | 14 | 9
(Australia) Clancy–Artacho del Solar | 21 | 21

Semifinals; 11 May
(China) X.Y. Xia–Wang | 21 | 21
(Vanuatu) Toko–Pata | 17 | 15
(Australia) Bell–Ngauamo | 17 | 8
(Australia) Clancy–Artacho del Solar | 21 | 21

Final; 12 May
(China) X.Y. Xia–Wang | 15 | 30
(Australia) Clancy–Artacho del Solar | 21 | 32
3rd place
(Vanuatu) Toko–Pata | 15 | 12
(Australia) Bell–Ngauamo | 21 | 21
