= 2020 Asian Beach Volleyball Championships =

- Location: Udon Thani, Thailand
- Dates: 13–16 February 2020

The 2020 Asian Beach Volleyball Championship was a beach volleyball event, that was held from 13 to 16 February, 2020 in Udon Thani, Thailand.

== Medal summary ==
Event	Gold	Silver	Bronze
Men	Australia; Chris McHugh; Damien Schumann	China; Wu Jiaxin; Abuduhalikejiang Mutailipu	Australia; Zachery Schubert; Max Guehrer
Women	China; Wang Fan; Xia Xinyi	China; Wang Jingzhe; Wen Shuhui	Japan; Megumi Murakami; Miki Ishii

== Participating nations ==
=== Men ===
- Australia (3)
- China (3)
- Chinese Taipei (3)
- Hong Kong (3)
- Iran (3)
- Japan (3)
- Kazakhstan (3)
- Laos (1)
- Malaysia (1)
- New Zealand (2)
- Singapore (1)
- Thailand (4)

=== Women ===
- Australia (3)
- China (3)
- Chinese Taipei (2)
- Hong Kong (2)
- Japan (3)
- Kazakhstan (2)
- Malaysia (2)
- Thailand (4)
- Vanuatu (2)

== Men's tournament ==
=== Preliminary round ===
==== Pool A ====
Pos	Team	Pld	W	L	Pts	SW	SL	SR	SPW	SPL	SPR
1	(China) T.Y. Yan–J. Li	2	1	1	3	3	2	1.500	94	83	1.133
2	(Thailand) J. Surin–N. Banlue	2	1	1	3	2	2	1.000	74	76	0.974
3	(Singapore) Shen–Tay Z.H.K.	2	1	1	3	2	3	0.667	85	94	0.904

Source: AVC

Date		Score		Set 1	Set 2	Set 3
13 Feb	T.Y. Yan–J. Li (China)	1–2	(Singapore) Shen–Tay Z.H.K.	21–15	18–21	13–15
13 Feb	J. Surin–N. Banlue (Thailand)	2–0	(Singapore) Shen–Tay Z.H.K.	21–17	21–17	
14 Feb	J. Surin–N. Banlue (Thailand)	0–2	(China) T.Y. Yan–J. Li	16–21	16–21	

==== Pool B ====
Pos	Team	Pld	W	L	Pts	SW	SL	SR	SPW	SPL	SPR
1	(Kazakhstan) Yakovlev–Bogatu	2	2	0	4	4	0	MAX	92	71	1.296
2	(China) P. Gao–Y. Li	2	1	1	3	2	2	1.000	85	80	1.063
3	(Japan) Koshikawa–Ikeda	2	0	2	2	0	4	0.000	58	84	0.690

Source: AVC

Date		Score		Set 1	Set 2	Set 3
13 Feb	Koshikawa–Ikeda (Japan)	0–2	(Kazakhstan) Yakovlev–Bogatu	13–21	15–21	
13 Feb	P. Gao–Y. Li (China)	0–2	(Kazakhstan) Yakovlev–Bogatu	27–29	16–21	
14 Feb	P. Gao–Y. Li (China)	2–0	(Japan) Koshikawa–Ikeda	21–13	21–17	

==== Pool C ====
Pos	Team	Pld	W	L	Pts	SW	SL	SR	SPW	SPL	SPR
1	(China) Wu Jiaxin–Ha Likejiang	3	3	0	6	6	1	6.000	137	89	1.539
2	(Kazakhstan) Dyachenko–Sidorenko	3	2	1	5	4	3	1.333	124	121	1.025
3	(Chinese Taipei) Hsu C.W.–Wu S.S.	3	1	2	4	4	4	1.000	133	147	0.905
4	(Thailand) M. Netitorn–M. Wachirawit	3	0	3	3	0	6	0.000	89	126	0.706

Source: AVC

Date		Score		Set 1	Set 2	Set 3
13 Feb	Wu Jiaxin–Ha Likejiang (China)	2–0	(Thailand) M. Netitorn–M. Wachirawit	21–11	21–14	
13 Feb	Hsu C.W.–Wu S.S. (Chinese Taipei)	1–2	(Kazakhstan) Dyachenko–Sidorenko	21–19	22–24	8–15
13 Feb	Wu Jiaxin–Ha Likejiang (China)	2–0	(Kazakhstan) Dyachenko–Sidorenko	21–13	21–11	
13 Feb	Hsu C.W.–Wu S.S. (Chinese Taipei)	2–0	(Thailand) M. Netitorn–M. Wachirawit	21–19	21–17	
14 Feb	Wu Jiaxin–Ha Likejiang (China)	2–1	(Chinese Taipei) Hsu C.W.–Wu S.S.	17–21	21–14	15–5
14 Feb	Dyachenko–Sidorenko (Kazakhstan)	2–0	(Thailand) M. Netitorn–M. Wachirawit	21–10	21–18	

==== Pool D ====
Pos	Team	Pld	W	L	Pts	SW	SL	SR	SPW	SPL	SPR
1	(Australia) McHugh–Schumann	3	3	0	6	6	0	MAX	128	85	1.506
2	(Iran) Javad F.–A. Aghajani	3	2	1	5	4	2	2.000	116	116	1.000
3	(New Zealand) Nicklin–Hartles	3	1	2	4	2	4	0.500	108	118	0.915
4	(Chinese Taipei) Chen Y.T.–Zhang F.M.	3	0	3	3	0	6	0.000	95	128	0.742

Source: AVC

Date		Score		Set 1	Set 2	Set 3
13 Feb	McHugh–Schumann (Australia)	2–0	(Chinese Taipei) Chen Y.T.–Zhang F.M.	21–15	21–8	
13 Feb	Nicklin–Hartles (New Zealand)	0–2	(Iran) Javad F.–A. Aghajani	15–21	19–21	
13 Feb	McHugh–Schumann (Australia)	2–0	(Iran) Javad F.–A. Aghajani	21–15	21–15	
13 Feb	Nicklin–Hartles (New Zealand)	2–0	(Chinese Taipei) Chen Y.T.–Zhang F.M.	21–15	21–17	
14 Feb	McHugh–Schumann (Australia)	2–0	(New Zealand) Nicklin–Hartles	23–21	21–11	
14 Feb	Javad F.–A. Aghajani (Iran)	2–0	(Chinese Taipei) Chen Y.T.–Zhang F.M.	23–21	21–19	

==== Pool E ====
Pos	Team	Pld	W	L	Pts	SW	SL	SR	SPW	SPL	SPR
1	(Japan) Takahashi–Hasegawa	3	3	0	6	6	0	MAX	126	91	1.385
2	(Chinese Taipei) Wang C.J.–Hsieh Y.J.	3	2	1	5	4	2	2.000	120	95	1.263
3	(Hong Kong) C.W. Wong–K.P. Wong	3	1	2	4	2	4	0.500	90	120	0.750
4	(Laos) Lid–Khampiene Sanyalack	3	0	3	3	0	6	0.000	98	128	0.766

Source: AVC

Date		Score		Set 1	Set 2	Set 3
13 Feb	Takahashi–Hasegawa (Japan)	2–0	(Laos) Lid–Khampiene Sanyalack	21–12	21–16	
13 Feb	Wang C.J.–Hsieh Y.J. (Chinese Taipei)	2–0	(Hong Kong) C.W. Wong–K.P. Wong	21–10	21–9	
13 Feb	Takahashi–Hasegawa (Japan)	2–0	(Hong Kong) C.W. Wong–K.P. Wong	21–16	21–12	
13 Feb	Wang C.J.–Hsieh Y.J. (Chinese Taipei)	2–0	(Laos) Lid–Khampiene Sanyalack	21–14	22–20	
14 Feb	C.W. Wong–K.P. Wong (Hong Kong)	2–0	(Laos) Lid–Khampiene Sanyalack	22–20	21–16	
14 Feb	Takahashi–Hasegawa (Japan)	2–0	(Chinese Taipei) Wang C.J.–Hsieh Y.J.	21–17	21–18	

==== Pool F ====
Pos	Team	Pld	W	L	Pts	SW	SL	SR	SPW	SPL	SPR
1	(Australia) Schubert–Guehrer	3	3	0	6	6	1	6.000	149	113	1.319
2	(Japan) Gottsu–Shiratori	3	2	1	5	5	2	2.500	151	127	1.189
3	(Thailand) K. Dunwinit–S. Prathip	3	1	2	4	2	4	0.500	112	122	0.918
4	(Hong Kong) P.L. Wong–W.K. Chan	3	0	3	3	0	6	0.000	76	126	0.603

Source: AVC

Date		Score		Set 1	Set 2	Set 3
13 Feb	Schubert–Guehrer (Australia)	2–0	(Hong Kong) P.L. Wong–W.K. Chan	21–16	21–10	
13 Feb	Gottsu–Shiratori (Japan)	2–0	(Thailand) K. Dunwinit–S. Prathip	29–27	21–15	
13 Feb	Schubert–Guehrer (Australia)	2–0	(Thailand) K. Dunwinit–S. Prathip	21–16	21–12	
13 Feb	Gottsu–Shiratori (Japan)	2–0	(Hong Kong) P.L. Wong–W.K. Chan	21–9	21–11	
14 Feb	Schubert–Guehrer (Australia)	2–1	(Japan) Gottsu–Shiratori	26–24	24–26	15–9
14 Feb	K. Dunwinit–S. Prathip (Thailand)	2–0	(Hong Kong) P.L. Wong–W.K. Chan	21–15	21–15	

==== Pool G ====
Pos	Team	Pld	W	L	Pts	SW	SL	SR	SPW	SPL	SPR
1	(Iran) Salemi B.–A. Vakili	3	2	1	5	5	2	2.500	137	125	1.096
2	(New Zealand) O'Dea B.–O'Dea S.	3	2	1	5	5	3	1.667	149	143	1.042
3	(Thailand) N. Kangkon–K. Adisorn	3	2	1	5	4	4	1.000	142	140	1.014
4	(Kazakhstan) Kuleshov–Petrossyants	3	0	3	3	1	6	0.167	119	139	0.856

Source: AVC

Date		Score		Set 1	Set 2	Set 3
13 Feb	Salemi B.–A. Vakili (Iran)	2–0	(Kazakhstan) Kuleshov–Petrossyants	21–19	21–17	
13 Feb	N. Kangkon–K. Adisorn (Thailand)	2–1	(New Zealand) O'Dea B.–O'Dea S.	21–18	18–21	15–12
13 Feb	Salemi B.–A. Vakili (Iran)	1–2	(New Zealand) O'Dea B.–O'Dea S.	21–18	17–21	15–17
13 Feb	N. Kangkon–K. Adisorn (Thailand)	2–1	(Kazakhstan) Kuleshov–Petrossyants	21–17	19–21	15–9
14 Feb	Salemi B.–A. Vakili (Iran)	2–0	(Thailand) N. Kangkon–K. Adisorn	21–18	21–15	
14 Feb	O'Dea B.–O'Dea S. (New Zealand)	2–0	(Kazakhstan) Kuleshov–Petrossyants	21–19	21–17	

==== Pool H ====
Pos	Team	Pld	W	L	Pts	SW	SL	SR	SPW	SPL	SPR
1	(Iran) Raoufi R.–A. Mirzaali	3	3	0	6	6	1	6.000	137	91	1.505
2	(Australia) Durant–Burnett	3	2	1	5	5	2	2.500	128	112	1.143
3	(Malaysia) Aizzat–Raja Nazmi	3	1	2	4	2	4	0.500	103	116	0.888
4	(Hong Kong) P.M. Yeung–K.L. Chui	3	0	3	3	0	6	0.000	77	126	0.611

Source: AVC

Date		Score		Set 1	Set 2	Set 3
13 Feb	Durant–Burnett (Australia)	2–0	(Malaysia) Aizzat–Raja Nazmi	21–17	21–17	
13 Feb	Raoufi R.–A. Mirzaali (Iran)	2–0	(Hong Kong) P.M. Yeung–K.L. Chui	21–9	21–11	
13 Feb	Raoufi R.–A. Mirzaali (Iran)	2–0	(Malaysia) Aizzat–Raja Nazmi	21–15	21–12	
13 Feb	Durant–Burnett (Australia)	2–0	(Hong Kong) P.M. Yeung–K.L. Chui	21–14	21–11	
14 Feb	Durant–Burnett (Australia)	1–2	(Iran) Raoufi R.–A. Mirzaali	13–21	21–17	10–15
14 Feb	P.M. Yeung–K.L. Chui (Hong Kong)	0–2	(Malaysia) Aizzat–Raja Nazmi	15–21	17–21	

=== Knockout round ===
Round of 16; 14 February
(China) T.Y. Yan–J. Li	21	11	9
(China) P. Gao–Y. Li	19	21	15
(Australia) Schubert–Guehrer	24	21
(Australia) Durant–Burnett	22	14
(Iran) Raoufi R.–A. Mirzaali	20	21	15
(Chinese Taipei) Wang C.J.–Hsieh Y.J.	22	19	13
(Iran) Javad F.–A. Aghajani	10	12
(China) Wu Jiaxin–Ha Likejiang	21	21
(Australia) McHugh–Schumann	21	17	16
(Thailand) J. Surin–N. Banlue	8	21	14
(New Zealand) O'Dea B.–O'Dea S.	30	21	9
(Japan) Takahashi–Hasegawa	32	15	15
(Iran) Salemi B.–A. Vakili	16	24	11
(Kazakhstan) Dyachenko–Sidorenko	21	22	15
(Japan) Gottsu–Shiratori	18	21	9
(Kazakhstan) Yakovlev–Bogatu	21	17	15

Quarterfinals; 15 February
(China) P. Gao–Y. Li	30	22
(Australia) Schubert–Guehrer	32	24
(Iran) Raoufi R.–A. Mirzaali	18	18
(China) Wu Jiaxin–Ha Likejiang	21	21
(Australia) McHugh–Schumann	21	21
(Japan) Takahashi–Hasegawa	12	13
(Kazakhstan) Dyachenko–Sidorenko	21	19	15
(Kazakhstan) Yakovlev–Bogatu	19	21	12

Semifinals; 15 February
(Australia) Schubert–Guehrer	11	15
(China) Wu Jiaxin–Ha Likejiang	21	21
(Australia) McHugh–Schumann	18	21	15
(Kazakhstan) Dyachenko–Sidorenko	21	8	9

Final; 16 February
(China) Wu Jiaxin–Ha Likejiang	17	21	10
(Australia) McHugh–Schumann	21	14	15
3rd place
(Australia) Schubert–Guehrer	25	21
(Kazakhstan) Dyachenko–Sidorenko	23	16

== Women's tournament ==
=== Preliminary round ===
==== Pool A ====
Pos	Team	Pld	W	L	Pts	SW	SL	SR	SPW	SPL	SPR
1	(Thailand) Radarong–Hongpak	2	1	1	3	3	2	1.500	91	76	1.197
2	(Kazakhstan) Tsimbalova–Samalikova	2	1	1	3	3	3	1.000	97	98	0.990
3	(Hong Kong) Y.Y. Koo–W.Y. Au Yeung	2	1	1	3	2	3	0.667	77	91	0.846

Source: AVC

Date		Score		Set 1	Set 2	Set 3
13 Feb	Radarong–Hongpak (Thailand)	1–2	(Kazakhstan) Tsimbalova–Samalikova	19–21	21–12	9–15
13 Feb	Radarong–Hongpak (Thailand)	2–0	(Hong Kong) Y.Y. Koo–W.Y. Au Yeung	21–15	21–13	
14 Feb	Y.Y. Koo–W.Y. Au Yeung (Hong Kong)	2–1	(Kazakhstan) Tsimbalova–Samalikova	13–21	21–16	15–12

==== Pool B ====
Pos	Team	Pld	W	L	Pts	SW	SL	SR	SPW	SPL	SPR
1	(China) Wang–X.Y. Xia	2	2	0	4	4	0	MAX	84	46	1.826
2	(Thailand) Chanthira–Yodsaphat	2	1	1	3	2	3	0.667	93	92	1.011
3	(Hong Kong) W.T. To–C.Y. Kong	2	0	2	2	1	4	0.250	60	99	0.606

Source: AVC

Date		Score		Set 1	Set 2	Set 3
13 Feb	Wang–X.Y. Xia (China)	2–0	(Hong Kong) W.T. To–C.Y. Kong	21–4	21–6	
13 Feb	Chanthira–Yodsaphat (Thailand)	2–1	(Hong Kong) W.T. To–C.Y. Kong	21–14	20–22	16–14
14 Feb	Wang–X.Y. Xia (China)	2–0	(Thailand) Chanthira–Yodsaphat	21–18	21–18	

==== Pool C ====
Pos	Team	Pld	W	L	Pts	SW	SL	SR	SPW	SPL	SPR
1	(China) Wang X.X.–Xue	2	2	0	4	4	0	MAX	84	34	2.471
2	(Thailand) Tangkaeo–Sumintra	2	1	1	3	2	3	0.667	70	83	0.843
3	(Malaysia) Tasha–Sin Xi	2	0	2	2	1	4	0.250	60	97	0.619

Source: AVC

Date		Score		Set 1	Set 2	Set 3
13 Feb	Wang X.X.–Xue (China)	2–0	(Thailand) Tangkaeo–Sumintra	21–7	21–8	
13 Feb	Tasha–Sin Xi (Malaysia)	1–2	(Thailand) Tangkaeo–Sumintra	11–21	21–19	9–15
14 Feb	Wang X.X.–Xue (China)	2–0	(Malaysia) Tasha–Sin Xi	21–10	21–9	

==== Pool D ====
Pos	Team	Pld	W	L	Pts	SW	SL	SR	SPW	SPL	SPR
1	(Japan) Murakami–Ishii	2	2	0	4	4	1	4.000	95	63	1.508
2	(Australia) Bell–Kendall	2	1	1	3	3	2	1.500	91	74	1.230
3	(Vanuatu) Joe–Lawac	2	0	2	2	0	4	0.000	35	84	0.417

Source: AVC

Date		Score		Set 1	Set 2	Set 3
13 Feb	Murakami–Ishii (Japan)	2–0	(Vanuatu) Joe–Lawac	21–7	21–7	
13 Feb	Bell–Kendall (Australia)	2–0	(Vanuatu) Joe–Lawac	21–6	21–15	
14 Feb	Murakami–Ishii (Japan)	2–1	(Australia) Bell–Kendall	17–21	21–17	15–11

==== Pool E ====
Pos	Team	Pld	W	L	Pts	SW	SL	SR	SPW	SPL	SPR
1	(Australia) Laird–Palmer	2	2	0	4	4	0	MAX	84	53	1.585
2	(Chinese Taipei) Yu Y.H.–Pan T.Y.	2	1	1	3	2	2	1.000	68	74	0.919
3	(Kazakhstan) Rachenko–Ukolova	2	0	2	2	0	4	0.000	59	84	0.702

Source: AVC

Date		Score		Set 1	Set 2	Set 3
13 Feb	Laird–Palmer (Australia)	2–0	(Kazakhstan) Rachenko–Ukolova	21–11	21–16	
13 Feb	Yu Y.H.–Pan T.Y. (Chinese Taipei)	2–0	(Kazakhstan) Rachenko–Ukolova	21–14	21–18	
14 Feb	Laird–Palmer (Australia)	2–0	(Chinese Taipei) Yu Y.H.–Pan T.Y.	21–12	21–14	

==== Pool F ====
Pos	Team	Pld	W	L	Pts	SW	SL	SR	SPW	SPL	SPR
1	(Japan) Hasegawa–Futami	2	2	0	4	4	0	MAX	85	49	1.735
2	(Thailand) Udomchavee–Numwong	2	1	1	3	2	2	1.000	77	61	1.262
3	(Malaysia) Yong–Sing Yee	2	0	2	2	0	4	0.000	32	84	0.381

Source: AVC

Date		Score		Set 1	Set 2	Set 3
13 Feb	Udomchavee–Numwong (Thailand)	2–0	(Malaysia) Yong–Sing Yee	21–11	21–7	
13 Feb	Udomchavee–Numwong (Thailand)	0–2	(Japan) Hasegawa–Futami	20–22	15–21	
14 Feb	Hasegawa–Futami (Japan)	2–0	(Malaysia) Yong–Sing Yee	21–8	21–6	

==== Pool G ====
Pos	Team	Pld	W	L	Pts	SW	SL	SR	SPW	SPL	SPR
1	(Japan) Mizoe–Take	2	2	0	4	4	0	MAX	89	65	1.369
2	(Chinese Taipei) Kou N.H.–Liu P.H.	2	1	1	3	2	2	1.000	83	76	1.092
3	(Australia) Fejes–Fleming	2	0	2	2	0	4	0.000	53	84	0.631

Source: AVC

Date		Score		Set 1	Set 2	Set 3
13 Feb	Mizoe–Take (Japan)	2–0	(Australia) Fejes–Fleming	21–13	21–11	
13 Feb	Kou N.H.–Liu P.H. (Chinese Taipei)	2–0	(Australia) Fejes–Fleming	21–13	21–11	
14 Feb	Mizoe–Take (Japan)	2–0	(Chinese Taipei) Kou N.H.–Liu P.H.	26–24	21–17	

==== Pool H ====
Pos	Team	Pld	W	L	Pts	SW	SL	SR	SPW	SPL	SPR
1	(China) J.Zh. Wang–Sh.H. Wen	1	1	0	2	2	0	MAX	42	25	1.680
2	(Vanuatu) Toko–Pata	1	0	1	1	0	2	0.000	25	42	0.595

Source: AVC

Date		Score		Set 1	Set 2	Set 3
14 Feb	Toko–Pata (Vanuatu)	0–2	(China) J.Zh. Wang–Sh.H. Wen	13–21	12–21	

=== Knockout round ===
Round of 16; 14 February
(Thailand) Radarong–Hongpak	W	O
(Thailand) Udomchavee–Numwong
(Japan) Mizoe–Take	21	21
(Thailand) Tangkaeo–Sumintra	11	12
(China) J.Zh. Wang–Sh.H. Wen	21	21
(Thailand) Chanthira–Yodsaphat	17	14
(Vanuatu) Toko–Pata	18	12
(China) Wang X.X.–Xue	21	21
(Japan) Murakami–Ishii	22	21	15
(Chinese Taipei) Yu Y.H.–Pan T.Y.	24	12	7
(Kazakhstan) Tsimbalova–Samalikova	30	13	9
(Australia) Laird–Palmer	28	21	15
(Japan) Hasegawa–Futami	19	13
(Australia) Bell–Kendall	21	21
(Chinese Taipei) Kou N.H.–Liu P.H.	11	12
(China) Wang–X.Y. Xia	21	21

Quarterfinals; 15 February
(Thailand) Radarong–Hongpak	19	20
(Japan) Mizoe–Take	21	22
(China) J.Zh. Wang–Sh.H. Wen	21	21
(China) Wang X.X.–Xue	19	17
(Japan) Murakami–Ishii	21	15	15
(Australia) Laird–Palmer	18	21	10
(Australia) Bell–Kendall	17	16
(China) Wang–X.Y. Xia	21	21

Semifinals; 15 February
(Japan) Mizoe–Take	13	14
(China) J.Zh. Wang–Sh.H. Wen	21	21
(Japan) Murakami–Ishii	15	16
(China) Wang–X.Y. Xia	21	21

Final; 16 February
(China) J.Zh. Wang–Sh.H. Wen	17	16
(China) Wang–X.Y. Xia	21	21
3rd place
(Japan) Mizoe–Take
(Japan) Murakami–Ishii	W	O
