= 2026 AVC Beach Volleyball Continental Championships =

International beach volleyball competition

2026 Asian Beach Volleyball Championships
- Location: Shangluo, China
- Dates: 2-6 September 2026
- Organizing body: AVC
- Competitors: 96 from 19 nations
- Teams: 24 per gender

The 2026 Asian Beach Volleyball Championship was a beach volleyball event, held from 2-6 September 2026 in Shangluo, China. A total of 48 pairs, 24 per gender, competed in the championships. There were 19 different countries represented across the tournament, 15 in the Men's and 14 in the Women's.

For both the Men's and Women's competition, the format consists of the 'Preliminary' group phase where the participating teams are split into six pools of fours. The two best ranked third-placed teams along with the pool winners and runner-ups progress to the Round of 16 in the 'Finals', while the remaining four third-placed teams will move onto a 'lucky loser' playoff to decide the remaining two teams in the knockouts. The winners receive a quota place for their National Olympic Committee(NOC) for the 2028 Summer Olympics.

== Competition schedule ==
The following is the competition schedule for the tournament:

| P | Pool stage | LL | Lucky losers | ⅛ | Round of 16 | ¼ | Quarter-finals | ½ | Semi-finals | B | Bronze medal match | G | Gold medal match |

| Event↓/Date → | Tue 1 | Wed 2 | Thu 3 | Fri 4 | | Sat 5 | | Sun 6 | |
|---|---|---|---|---|---|---|---|---|---|
| Men | —N/a | P | P | LL | ⅛ | ¼ | ½ | B | G |
| Women | P | P | P | LL | ⅛ | ¼ | ½ | B | G |

== Medal Summary ==
| Event | Gold | Silver | Bronze |
|---|---|---|---|
| Men | Australia; Nicolaidis; Carracher | Australia; Hodges; Hood | China; Wu Jiaxin; Ch. W. Zhou |
| Women | Australia; Fejes; Clancy | China; Yan X. X.Y. Xia | Japan; Shiba; Reika |

== Qualification ==
A total of 24 men's and 24 women's teams qualified for the championships. The hosts and previous champion both received one berth, while two places were allocated to each of the five zonal associations. Each zonal association could choose whether or not to host a qualification tournament. If not, the two highest ranked eligible teams were chosen from that zone according to the AVC Team Ranking. A maximum of one team per National Federation(NF) could qualify through the zonal associations. The remaining twelve teams were the highest ranked eligible teams, according to the AVC Team Ranking, while keeping to the two teams per NF limit.

=== Men ===
| Event | Date | Location | Vacancies | Qualified |
|---|---|---|---|---|
| Host Nation | —N/a | —N/a | 1 | China |
| 2024 Asian Beach Volleyball Championships | 5-10 November 2024 | Santa Rosa, Philippines | 1 | Australia |
| WAVA | 11-12 July 2026 | Muscat, Oman | 2 | Oman; Lebanon |
| CAVA | 25-27 July 2026 | Tashkent, Uzbekistan | 2 | Iran; Kazakhstan |
| EAVA | —N/a | —N/a | 2 | Hong Kong (2); Japan (2); New Zealand (2); Thailand (2); Qatar (2); Australia; China; Indonesia; Iran; Kazakhstan; Malaysia; Philippines; Uzbekistan |
| OZVA | —N/a | —N/a | 2 | Hong Kong (2); Japan (2); New Zealand (2); Thailand (2); Qatar (2); Australia; China; Indonesia; Iran; Kazakhstan; Malaysia; Philippines; Uzbekistan |
| SEAVA | —N/a | —N/a | 2 | Hong Kong (2); Japan (2); New Zealand (2); Thailand (2); Qatar (2); Australia; China; Indonesia; Iran; Kazakhstan; Malaysia; Philippines; Uzbekistan |
| AVC Team Ranking | 29 July 2026 | —N/a | 12 | Hong Kong (2); Japan (2); New Zealand (2); Thailand (2); Qatar (2); Australia; China; Indonesia; Iran; Kazakhstan; Malaysia; Philippines; Uzbekistan |
| Total | | | 24 | |

=== Women ===
| Event | Date | Location | Vacancies | Qualified |
|---|---|---|---|---|
| Host Nation | —N/a | —N/a | 1 | China |
| 2024 Asian Beach Volleyball Championships | 5-10 November 2024 | Santa Rosa, Philippines | 1 | China |
| CAVA | 25-27 July 2026 | Tashkent, Uzbekistan | 2 | Kyrgyzstan; Uzbekistan |
| EAVA | —N/a | —N/a | 2 | Australia (2); Hong Kong (2); Japan (2); Kazakhstan (2); Mongolia (2); New Zealand (2); Philippines (2); Thailand (2); Kyrgyzstan; Malaysia; Singapore; Uzbekistan; Vanuatu |
| OZVA | —N/a | —N/a | 2 | Australia (2); Hong Kong (2); Japan (2); Kazakhstan (2); Mongolia (2); New Zealand (2); Philippines (2); Thailand (2); Kyrgyzstan; Malaysia; Singapore; Uzbekistan; Vanuatu |
| SEAVA | —N/a | —N/a | 2 | Australia (2); Hong Kong (2); Japan (2); Kazakhstan (2); Mongolia (2); New Zealand (2); Philippines (2); Thailand (2); Kyrgyzstan; Malaysia; Singapore; Uzbekistan; Vanuatu |
| WAVA | —N/a | —N/a | 2 | Australia (2); Hong Kong (2); Japan (2); Kazakhstan (2); Mongolia (2); New Zealand (2); Philippines (2); Thailand (2); Kyrgyzstan; Malaysia; Singapore; Uzbekistan; Vanuatu |
| AVC Team Ranking | 29 July 2026 | —N/a | 12 | Australia (2); Hong Kong (2); Japan (2); Kazakhstan (2); Mongolia (2); New Zealand (2); Philippines (2); Thailand (2); Kyrgyzstan; Malaysia; Singapore; Uzbekistan; Vanuatu |
| Total | | | 24 | |

== Participating Nations ==
=== Men ===
- Australia (2)
- China (2)
- Hong Kong (2)
- Iran (2)
- Japan (2)
- Kazakhstan (2)
- New Zealand (2)
- Thailand (2)
- Qatar (2)
- Indonesia (1)
- Lebanon (1)
- Malaysia (1)
- Oman (1)
- Philippines (1)
- Uzbekistan (1)

=== Women ===
- Australia (2)
- China (2)
- Hong Kong (2)
- Japan (2)
- Kazakhstan (2)
- Mongolia (2)
- New Zealand (2)
- Philippines (2)
- Thailand (2)
- Uzbekistan (2)
- Kyrgyzstan (1)
- Malaysia (1)
- Singapore (1)
- Vanuatu (1)

== Men's Competition ==
=== Preliminary round ===
==== Pool A ====
| Pos | Team | Pld | W | L | Pts | SW | SL | SR | SPW | SPL | SPR |
|---|---|---|---|---|---|---|---|---|---|---|---|
| 1 | (China) Wu Jiaxin–Ch. W. Zhou | 3 | 3 | 0 | 6 | 6 | 0 | MAX | 126 | 82 | 1.537 |
| 2 | (Iran) A. Pouraskari–A. Aghajani | 3 | 2 | 1 | 5 | 4 | 2 | 2.000 | 116 | 81 | 1.432 |
| 3 | (New Zealand) Krajci–Smith | 3 | 1 | 2 | 4 | 2 | 4 | 0.500 | 97 | 111 | 0.874 |
| 4 | (Uzbekistan) Nodirjon–Muhamadiev | 3 | 0 | 3 | 3 | 0 | 6 | 0.000 | 116 | 126 | 0.921 |

Source: AVC

| Date | Time | | Score | | Set 1 | Set 2 | Set 3 | Total |
|---|---|---|---|---|---|---|---|---|
| 2 Sep | 09:00 | (China) Wu Jiaxin–Ch. W. Zhou | 2–0 | (Uzbekistan) Nodirjon–Muhamadiev | 21–7 | 21–11 | | 42–18 |
| 2 Sep | 10:40 | (New Zealand) Krajci–Smith | 0–2 | (Iran) A. Pouraskari–A. Aghajani | 13–21 | 10–21 | | 23–42 |
| 2 Sep | 19:00 | (China) Wu Jiaxin–Ch. W. Zhou | 2–0 | (Iran) A. Pouraskari–A. Aghajani | 21–13 | 21–19 | | 42–32 |
| 2 Sep | 20:40 | (New Zealand) Krajci–Smith | 2–0 | (Uzbekistan) Nodirjon–Muhamadiev | 21–9 | 21–18 | | 42–27 |
| 3 Sep | 15:00 | (China) Wu Jiaxin–Ch. W. Zhou | 2–0 | (New Zealand) Krajci–Smith | 21–16 | 21–16 | | 42–32 |
| 3 Sep | 15:00 | (Iran) A. Pouraskari–A. Aghajani | 2–0 | (Uzbekistan) Nodirjon–Muhamadiev | 21–3 | 21–13 | | 42–16 |

Source: AVC

==== Pool B ====
| Pos | Team | Pld | W | L | Pts | SW | SL | SR | SPW | SPL | SPR |
|---|---|---|---|---|---|---|---|---|---|---|---|
| 1 | (Qatar) Cherif–Ahmed | 3 | 3 | 0 | 6 | 6 | 1 | 6.000 | 130 | 90 | 1.444 |
| 2 | (New Zealand) O'Dea, S.–O'Dea B. | 3 | 2 | 1 | 5 | 5 | 3 | 1.667 | 145 | 124 | 1.169 |
| 3 | (Thailand) Netitorn–T. Poravid | 3 | 1 | 2 | 4 | 3 | 4 | 0.750 | 121 | 110 | 1.100 |
| 4 | (Malaysia) Teh–Yongjian | 3 | 0 | 3 | 3 | 0 | 6 | 0.000 | 45 | 126 | 0.357 |

Source: AVC

| Date | Time | | Score | | Set 1 | Set 2 | Set 3 | Total |
|---|---|---|---|---|---|---|---|---|
| 2 Sep | 09:00 | (Qatar) Cherif–Ahmed | 2–0 | (Malaysia) Teh–Yongjian | 21–8 | 21–5 | | 42–13 |
| 2 Sep | 10:40 | (Thailand) Netitorn–T. Poravid | 1–2 | (New Zealand) O'Dea, S.–O'Dea B. | 21–17 | 14–21 | 15–17 | 50–55 |
| 2 Sep | 19:00 | (Qatar) Cherif–Ahmed | 2–1 | (New Zealand) O'Dea, S.–O'Dea B. | 21–14 | 19–21 | 15–13 | 55–48 |
| 2 Sep | 20:40 | (Thailand) Netitorn–T. Poravid | 2–0 | (Malaysia) Teh–Yongjian | 21–6 | 21–7 | | 42–13 |
| 3 Sep | 15:00 | (Qatar) Cherif–Ahmed | 2–0 | (Thailand) Netitorn–T. Poravid | 21–18 | 21–11 | | 42–29 |
| 3 Sep | 15:00 | (New Zealand) O'Dea, S.–O'Dea B. | 2–0 | (Malaysia) Teh–Yongjian | 21–5 | 21–14 | | 42–19 |

Source: AVC

==== Pool C ====
| Pos | Team | Pld | W | L | Pts | SW | SL | SR | SPW | SPL | SPR |
|---|---|---|---|---|---|---|---|---|---|---|---|
| 1 | (Australia) Nicolaidis–Carracher | 3 | 3 | 0 | 6 | 6 | 1 | 6.000 | 138 | 105 | 1.314 |
| 2 | (Japan) Kai–Adachi | 3 | 2 | 1 | 5 | 5 | 2 | 2.500 | 133 | 119 | 1.118 |
| 3 | (Lebanon) Jad–Hadi | 3 | 1 | 2 | 4 | 2 | 4 | 0.500 | 105 | 120 | 0.875 |
| 4 | (Philippines) Buytrago–Rosales | 3 | 0 | 3 | 3 | 0 | 6 | 0.000 | 94 | 126 | 0.746 |

Source: AVC

| Date | Time | | Score | | Set 1 | Set 2 | Set 3 | Total |
|---|---|---|---|---|---|---|---|---|
| 2 Sep | 09:00 | (Australia) Nicolaidis–Carracher | 2-0 | (Lebanon) Jadi–Hadi | 21–13 | 21–14 | | 42–27 |
| 2 Sep | 10:40 | (Japan) Kai–Adachi | 2–0 | (Philippines) Buytrago–Rosales | 21–15 | 21–14 | | 42–29 |
| 2 Sep | 19:00 | (Australia) Nicolaidis–Carracher | 2-0 | (Philippines) Buytrago–Rosales | 21–12 | 21–17 | | 42–29 |
| 2 Sep | 20:40 | (Japan) Kai–Adachi | 2–0 | (Lebanon) Jadi–Hadi | 21–18 | 21–18 | | 42–36 |
| 3 Sep | 15:50 | (Philippines) Buytrago–Rosales | 0–2 | (Lebanon) Jadi–Hadi | 18–21 | 18–21 | | 36–42 |
| 3 Sep | 17:30 | (Australia) Nicolaidis–Carracher | 2–1 | (Japan) Kai–Adachi | 21–16 | 18–21 | 15–12 | 54–49 |

Source: AVC

==== Pool D ====
| Pos | Team | Pld | W | L | Pts | SW | SL | SR | SPW | SPL | SPR |
|---|---|---|---|---|---|---|---|---|---|---|---|
| 1 | (Australia) Hodges–Hood | 3 | 3 | 0 | 6 | 6 | 0 | MAX | 126 | 90 | 1.400 |
| 2 | (Iran) Abolhassan–Ghalehnovi | 3 | 1 | 2 | 4 | 2 | 4 | 0.500 | 108 | 112 | 0.964 |
| 3 | (Kazakhstan) Bogatu–Gurin | 3 | 1 | 2 | 4 | 2 | 4 | 0.500 | 99 | 114 | 0.868 |
| 4 | (Oman) Mazin–Hood | 3 | 1 | 2 | 4 | 2 | 4 | 0.500 | 103 | 120 | 0.858 |

Source: AVC

| Date | Time | | Score | | Set 1 | Set 2 | Set 3 | Total |
|---|---|---|---|---|---|---|---|---|
| 2 Sep | 9:50 | (Australia) Hodges–Hood | 2–0 | (Oman) Mazin–Hood | 21–19 | 21–12 | | 42–31 |
| 2 Sep | 11:30 | (Kazakhstan) Bogatu–Gurin | 0–2 | (Iran) Abolhassan–Ghalehnovi | 13–21 | 15–21 | | 28–42 |
| 2 Sep | 19:50 | (Australia) Hodges–Hood | 2–0 | (Iran) Abolhassan–Ghalehnovi | 21–16 | 21–14 | | 42–30 |
| 2 Sep | 21:30 | (Kazakhstan) Bogatu–Gurin | 2–0 | (Oman) Mazin–Hood | 21–12 | 21–18 | | 42–30 |
| 3 Sep | 15:50 | (Iran) Abolhassan–Ghalehnovi | 0–2 | (Oman) Mazin–Hood | 17–21 | 19–21 | | 36–42 |
| 3 Sep | 17:30 | (Australia) Hodges–Hood | 2–0 | (Kazakhstan) Bogatu–Gurin | 21–12 | 21–17 | | 42–29 |

Source: AVC

==== Pool E ====
| Pos | Team | Pld | W | L | Pts | SW | SL | SR | SPW | SPL | SPR |
|---|---|---|---|---|---|---|---|---|---|---|---|
| 1 | (Indonesia) Bintang–Sofyan | 3 | 3 | 0 | 6 | 6 | 0 | MAX | 126 | 85 | 1.482 |
| 2 | (Japan) Takahashi–Ikeda | 3 | 2 | 1 | 5 | 4 | 2 | 2.000 | 115 | 99 | 1.162 |
| 3 | (Kazakhstan) Yakovlev–Mokhammad | 3 | 1 | 2 | 4 | 2 | 4 | 0.500 | 104 | 113 | 0.920 |
| 4 | (Hong Kong) P.L. Wong–Chong | 3 | 0 | 3 | 3 | 0 | 6 | 0.000 | 78 | 126 | 0.619 |

Source: AVC

| Date | Time | | Score | | Set 1 | Set 2 | Set 3 | Total |
|---|---|---|---|---|---|---|---|---|
| 2 Sep | 9:50 | (Indonesia) Bintang–Sofyan | 2–0 | (Hong Kong) P.L. Wong–Chong | 21–10 | 21–12 | | 42–22 |
| 2 Sep | 11:30 | (Japan) Takahashi–Ikeda | 2–0 | (Kazakhstan) Yakovlev–Mokhammad | 21–13 | 21–17 | | 42–30 |
| 2 Sep | 19:50 | (Indonesia) Bintang–Sofyan | 2–0 | (Kazakhstan) Yakovlev–Mokhammad | 21–17 | 21–15 | | 42–32 |
| 2 Sep | 21:30 | (Japan) Takahashi–Ikeda | 2–0 | (Hong Kong) P.L. Wong–Chong | 21–12 | 21–15 | | 42–27 |
| 3 Sep | 16:40 | (Kazakhstan) Yakovlev–Mokhammad | 2–0 | (Hong Kong) P.L. Wong–Chong | 21–12 | 21–17 | | 42–29 |
| 3 Sep | 17:30 | (Indonesia) Bintang–Sofyan | 2–0 | (Japan) Takahashi–Ikeda | 21–16 | 21–15 | | 42–31 |

Source: AVC

==== Pool F ====
| Pos | Team | Pld | W | L | Pts | SW | SL | SR | SPW | SPL | SPR |
|---|---|---|---|---|---|---|---|---|---|---|---|
| 1 | (Thailand) T. Pithak–M. Wachirawit | 3 | 3 | 0 | 6 | 6 | 1 | 6.000 | 142 | 120 | 1.183 |
| 2 | (China) Wang Y. W.–Du Hongjun | 3 | 2 | 1 | 5 | 5 | 2 | 2.500 | 136 | 107 | 1.271 |
| 3 | (Qatar) M. Alkeer–M. Ihab | 3 | 1 | 2 | 4 | 2 | 4 | 0.500 | 103 | 113 | 0.912 |
| 4 | (Hong Kong) L.F. Lee–C. H. Lee | 3 | 0 | 3 | 3 | 0 | 6 | 0.000 | 85 | 126 | 0.675 |

Source: AVC

| Date | Time | | Score | | Set 1 | Set 2 | Set 3 | Total |
|---|---|---|---|---|---|---|---|---|
| 2 Sep | 9:50 | (China) Wang Y. W.–Du Hongjun | 2–0 | (Qatar) M. Alkeer–M. Ihab | 21–12 | 21–12 | | 42–24 |
| 2 Sep | 11:30 | (Thailand) T. Pithak–M. Wachirawit | 2–0 | (Hong Kong) L.F. Lee–C. H. Lee | 21–17 | 21–14 | | 42–31 |
| 2 Sep | 19:50 | (China) Wang Y. W.–Du Hongjun | 2–0 | (Hong Kong) L.F. Lee–C. H. Lee | 21–14 | 21–11 | | 42–25 |
| 2 Sep | 21:30 | (Thailand) T. Pithak–M. Wachirawit | 2–0 | (Qatar) M. Alkeer–M. Ihab | 21–19 | 21–18 | | 42–37 |
| 3 Sep | 16:40 | (China) Wang Y. W.–Du Hongjun | 1–2 | (Thailand) T. Pithak–M. Wachirawit | 22–20 | 21–23 | 9–15 | 52–58 |
| 3 Sep | 16:40 | (Hong Kong) L.F. Lee–C. H. Lee | 0–2 | (Qatar) M. Alkeer–M. Ihab | 17–21 | 12–21 | | 29–42 |

Source: AVC

==== Third place rankings ====
| Pos | Grp | Team | Pld | W | L | Pts | SW | SL | SR | SPW | SPL | SPR | Qualification |
|---|---|---|---|---|---|---|---|---|---|---|---|---|---|
| 1 | B | (Thailand) Netitorn–T. Poravid | 3 | 1 | 2 | 4 | 3 | 4 | 0.750 | 121 | 110 | 1.100 | Round of 16 |
| 2 | E | (Kazakhstan) Yakovlev–Mokhammad | 3 | 1 | 2 | 4 | 2 | 4 | 0.500 | 104 | 113 | 0.920 | Round of 16 |
| 3 | F | (Qatar) M. Alkeer–M. Ihab | 3 | 1 | 2 | 4 | 2 | 4 | 0.500 | 103 | 113 | 0.912 | Round of 18 |
| 4 | C | (Lebanon) Jad–Hadi | 3 | 1 | 2 | 4 | 2 | 4 | 0.500 | 105 | 120 | 0.875 | Round of 18 |
| 5 | A | (New Zealand) Krajci–Smith | 3 | 1 | 2 | 4 | 2 | 4 | 0.500 | 97 | 111 | 0.874 | Round of 18 |
| 6 | D | (Kazakhstan) Bogatu–Gurin | 3 | 1 | 2 | 4 | 2 | 4 | 0.500 | 99 | 114 | 0.868 | Round of 18 |

Source: AVC

=== Knockout round ===
Round of 18; 4 September
(Lebanon) Jad–Hadi | 21 | 21
(New Zealand) Krajci–Smith | 11 | 18
(Qatar) M. Alkeer–M. Ihab | 16 | 15
(Kazakhstan) Bogatu–Gurin | 21 | 21

Round of 16; 4 September
(China) Wu Jiaxin–Ch. W. Zhou | 21 | 21
(Lebanon) Jad–Hadi | 11 | 15
(Iran) Abolhassan–Ghalehnovi | 21 | 23
(Japan) Kai–Adachi | 17 | 21
(Indonesia) Bintang–Sofyan | 21 | 23
(New Zealand) O'Dea, S.–O'Dea B. | 18 | 21
(Kazakhstan) Yakovlev–Mokhammad | 10 | 11
(Australia) Hodges–Hood | 21 | 21
(Kazakhstan) Bogatu–Gurin | 12 | 13
(Qatar) Cherif–Ahmed | 21 | 21
(China) Wang Y. W.–Du Hongjun | 21 | 21
(Japan) Takahashi–Ikeda | 15 | 9
(Australia) Nicolaidis–Carracher | 21 | 21
(Thailand) Netitorn–T. Poravid | 14 | 14
(Iran) A. Pouraskari–A. Aghajani | 17 | 22 | 11
(Thailand) T. Pithak–M. Wachirawit | 21 | 20 | 15

Quarterfinals; 5 September
(China) Wu Jiaxin–Ch. W. Zhou | 24 | 21
(Iran) Abolhassan–Ghalehnovi | 22 | 13
(Indonesia) Bintang–Sofyan | 21 | 14 | 13
(Australia) Hodges–Hood | 19 | 21 | 15
(Qatar) Cherif–Ahmed | 21 | 21
(China) Wang Y. W.–Du Hongjun | 12 | 16
(Australia) Nicolaidis–Carracher | 21 | 21
(Thailand) T. Pithak–M. Wachirawit | 13 | 10

Semifinals; 5 September
(China) Wu Jiaxin–Ch. W. Zhou | 14 | 16
(Australia) Hodges–Hood | 21 | 21
(Qatar) Cherif–Ahmed | 21 | 22 | 11
(Australia) Nicolaidis–Carracher | 14 | 24 | 15

Final; 6 September
(Australia) Hodges–Hood | 17 | 21 | 12
(Australia) Nicolaidis–Carracher | 21 | 17 | 15
3rd place
(China) Wu Jiaxin–Ch. W. Zhou | 21 | 21
(Qatar) Cherif–Ahmed^{[a]} | 0 | 0

a. Cherif-Ahmed forfeited the match due to injury.

=== Final standing ===
| Pos. | Team |
|---|---|
| 1st place, gold medalist(s) | (Australia) Nicolaidis–Carracher |
| 2nd place, silver medalist(s) | (Australia) Hodges–Hood |
| 3rd place, bronze medalist(s) | (China) Wu Jiaxin–Ch. W. Zhou |
| 4 | (Qatar) Cherif–Ahmed |
| 5 | (China) Wang Y. W.–Du Hongjun |
| 5 | (Indonesia) Bintang–Sofyan |
| 5 | (Iran) Abolhassan–Ghalehnovi |
| 5 | (Thailand) T. Pithak–M. Wachirawit |
| 9 | (Iran) A. Pouraskari–A. Aghajani |
| 9 | (Japan) Kai–Adachi |
| 9 | (Japan) Takahashi–Ikeda |
| 9 | (Kazakhstan) Bogatu–Gurin |
| 9 | (Kazakhstan) Yakovlev–Mokhammad |
| 9 | (Lebanon) Jad–Hadi |
| 9 | (New Zealand) O'Dea, S.–O'Dea B. |
| 9 | (Thailand) Netitorn–T. Poravid |
| 17 | (New Zealand) Krajci–Smith |
| 17 | (Qatar) M. Alkeer–M. Ihab |
| 19 | (Hong Kong) L.F. Lee–C. H. Lee |
| 19 | (Hong Kong) P.L. Wong–Chong |
| 19 | (Malaysia) Teh–Yongjian |
| 19 | (Oman) Mazin–Hood |
| 19 | (Philippines) Buytrago–Rosales |
| 19 | (Uzbekistan) Nodirjon–Muhamadiev |

| Qualified for the 2028 Summer Olympics |

== Women's Competition ==
=== Preliminary round ===
==== Pool A ====
| Pos | Team | Pld | W | L | Pts | SW | SL | SR | SPW | SPL | SPR |
|---|---|---|---|---|---|---|---|---|---|---|---|
| 1 | (China) Yan X.–X.Y. Xia | 3 | 3 | 0 | 6 | 6 | 0 | MAX | 126 | 42 | 3.000 |
| 2 | (Hong Kong) N.L. Tsang–M.C. Wong | 3 | 2 | 1 | 5 | 4 | 3 | 1.333 | 118 | 101 | 1.168 |
| 3 | (Singapore) Lee X.E.V–Ang H.Y | 3 | 1 | 2 | 4 | 3 | 4 | 0.750 | 99 | 122 | 0.811 |
| 4 | (Mongolia) Anudari–Khatanzaya | 3 | 0 | 3 | 3 | 0 | 6 | 0.000 | 46 | 126 | 0.365 |

Source: AVC

| Date | Time | | Score | | Set 1 | Set 2 | Set 3 | Total |
|---|---|---|---|---|---|---|---|---|
| Sep 1 | 20:50 | (China) Yan X.–X.Y. Xia | 2–0 | (Mongolia) Anudari–Khatanzaya | 21–4 | 21–2 | | 42–6 |
| Sep 2 | 16:40 | (Hong Kong) N.L. Tsang–M.C. Wong | 2–1 | (Singapore) Lee X.E.V–Ang H.Y | 21–13 | 19–21 | 15–8 | 55–42 |
| Sep 3 | 9:50 | (China) Yan X.–X.Y. Xia | 2–0 | (Singapore) Lee X.E.V–Ang H.Y | 21–7 | 21–8 | | 42–15 |
| Sep 3 | 11:30 | (Hong Kong) N.L. Tsang–M.C. Wong | 2–0 | (Mongolia) Anudari–Khatanzaya | 21–11 | 21–6 | | 42–17 |
| Sep 3 | 19:50 | (China) Yan X.–X.Y. Xia | 2–0 | (Hong Kong) N.L. Tsang–M.C. Wong | 21–10 | 21–11 | | 42–21 |
| Sep 3 | 21:30 | (Singapore) Lee X.E.V–Ang H.Y | 2–0 | (Mongolia) Anudari–Khatanzaya | 21–15 | 21–10 | | 42–25 |

Source: AVC

==== Pool B ====
| Pos | Team | Pld | W | L | Pts | SW | SL | SR | SPW | SPL | SPR |
|---|---|---|---|---|---|---|---|---|---|---|---|
| 1 | (Australia) Fejes–Clancy | 3 | 3 | 0 | 6 | 6 | 0 | MAX | 126 | 58 | 2.172 |
| 2 | (New Zealand) Green–Tiplady | 3 | 2 | 1 | 5 | 4 | 2 | 2.000 | 106 | 94 | 1.128 |
| 3 | (Hong Kong) W.T. To–W.M. To | 3 | 1 | 2 | 4 | 2 | 4 | 0.500 | 96 | 96 | 1.000 |
| 4 | (Mongolia) Uuganchimeg–Oyuntuya | 3 | 0 | 3 | 3 | 0 | 6 | 0.000 | 43 | 126 | 0.341 |

Source: AVC

| Date | Time | | Score | | Set 1 | Set 2 | Set 3 | Total |
|---|---|---|---|---|---|---|---|---|
| Sep 2 | 15:00 | (Australia) Fejes–Clancy | 2–0 | (Mongolia) Uuganchimeg–Oyuntuya | 21–7 | 21–5 | | 42–12 |
| Sep 2 | 16:40 | (New Zealand) Green–Tiplady | 2–0 | (Hong Kong) W.T. To–W.M. To | 21–16 | 21–17 | | 42–33 |
| Sep 3 | 9:50 | (Australia) Fejes–Clancy | 2–0 | (Hong Kong) W.T. To–W.M. To | 21–10 | 21–11 | | 42–21 |
| Sep 3 | 11:30 | (New Zealand) Green–Tiplady | 2–0 | (Mongolia) Uuganchimeg–Oyuntuya | 21–3 | 21–16 | | 42–19 |
| Sep 3 | 19:50 | (Australia) Fejes–Clancy | 2–0 | (New Zealand) Green–Tiplady | 21–18 | 21–7 | | 42–25 |
| Sep 3 | 21:30 | (Hong Kong) W.T. To–W.M. To | 2–0 | (Mongolia) Uuganchimeg–Oyuntuya | 21–4 | 21–8 | | 42–12 |

Source: AVC

==== Pool C ====
| Pos | Team | Pld | W | L | Pts | SW | SL | SR | SPW | SPL | SPR |
|---|---|---|---|---|---|---|---|---|---|---|---|
| 1 | (Japan) Shiba–Reika | 3 | 3 | 0 | 6 | 6 | 0 | MAX | 126 | 71 | 1.775 |
| 2 | (Philippines) Progella–Pagara | 3 | 2 | 1 | 5 | 4 | 2 | 2.000 | 111 | 81 | 1.370 |
| 3 | (Kazakhstan) Karimova–Ryukhova | 3 | 1 | 2 | 4 | 2 | 4 | 0.500 | 97 | 101 | 0.960 |
| 4 | (Uzbekistan) Shagraeva–Uralova | 3 | 0 | 3 | 3 | 0 | 6 | 0.000 | 45 | 126 | 0.357 |

Source: AVC

| Date | Time | | Score | | Set 1 | Set 2 | Set 3 | Total |
|---|---|---|---|---|---|---|---|---|
| Sep 2 | 15:00 | (Japan) Shiba–Reika | 2–0 | (Uzbekistan) Shagraeva–Uralova | 21–6 | 21–10 | | 42–16 |
| Sep 2 | 16:40 | (Philippines) Progella–Pagara | 2–0 | (Kazakhstan) Karimova–Ryukhova | 21–13 | 21–14 | | 42–27 |
| Sep 3 | 9:50 | (Japan) Shiba–Reika | 2–0 | (Kazakhstan) Karimova–Ryukhova | 21–14 | 21–14 | | 42–28 |
| Sep 3 | 11:30 | (Philippines) Progella–Pagara | 2–0 | (Uzbekistan) Shagraeva–Uralova | 21–5 | 21–7 | | 42–12 |
| Sep 3 | 19:50 | (Japan) Shiba–Reika | 2–0 | (Philippines) Progella–Pagara | 21–11 | 21–16 | | 42–27 |
| Sep 3 | 21:30 | (Kazakhstan) Karimova–Ryukhova | 2–0 | (Uzbekistan) Shagraeva–Uralova | 21–6 | 21–11 | | 42–17 |

Source: AVC

==== Pool D ====
| Pos | Team | Pld | W | L | Pts | SW | SL | SR | SPW | SPL | SPR |
|---|---|---|---|---|---|---|---|---|---|---|---|
| 1 | (New Zealand) Polley–MacDonald | 3 | 3 | 0 | 6 | 6 | 1 | 6.000 | 145 | 115 | 1.261 |
| 2 | (Thailand) Naraphornrapat–Woranatchayakorn | 3 | 2 | 1 | 5 | 5 | 2 | 2.500 | 142 | 99 | 1.434 |
| 3 | (Vanuatu) Toko–Pata | 3 | 1 | 2 | 4 | 2 | 5 | 0.400 | 108 | 130 | 0.831 |
| 4 | (Kyrgyzstan) Rasulbek Kyzy–Kudaikulova | 3 | 0 | 3 | 3 | 1 | 6 | 0.167 | 87 | 138 | 0.630 |

Source: AVC

| Date | Time | | Score | | Set 1 | Set 2 | Set 3 | Total |
|---|---|---|---|---|---|---|---|---|
| Sep 2 | 15:50 | (New Zealand) Polley–MacDonald | 2–0 | (Kyrgyzstan) Rasulbek Kyzy–Kudaikulova | 21–11 | 21–12 | | 42–23 |
| Sep 2 | 17:30 | (Thailand) Naraphornrapat–Woranatchayakorn | 2–0 | (Vanuatu) Toko–Pata | 21–9 | 21–11 | | 42–20 |
| Sep 3 | 9:00 | (New Zealand) Polley–MacDonald | 2–0 | (Vanuatu) Toko–Pata | 21–19 | 21–15 | | 42–34 |
| Sep 3 | 10:40 | (Thailand) Naraphornrapat–Woranatchayakorn | 2–0 | (Kyrgyzstan) Rasulbek Kyzy–Kudaikulova | 21–8 | 21–10 | | 42–18 |
| Sep 3 | 19:00 | (Vanuatu) Toko–Pata | 2–1 | (Kyrgyzstan) Rasulbek Kyzy–Kudaikulova | 21–12 | 18–21 | 15–13 | 54–46 |
| Sep 3 | 20:40 | (New Zealand) Polley–MacDonald | 2–1 | (Thailand) Naraphornrapat–Woranatchayakorn | 25–27 | 21–19 | 15–12 | 61–58 |

Source: AVC

==== Pool E ====
| Pos | Team | Pld | W | L | Pts | SW | SL | SR | SPW | SPL | SPR |
|---|---|---|---|---|---|---|---|---|---|---|---|
| 1 | (Australia) Fleming–Alchin | 3 | 3 | 0 | 6 | 6 | 1 | 6.000 | 141 | 97 | 1.454 |
| 2 | (Thailand) S. Patcharaporn–S. Samitta | 3 | 2 | 1 | 5 | 5 | 3 | 1.667 | 142 | 118 | 1.203 |
| 3 | (Philippines) Rondina–Pons | 3 | 1 | 2 | 4 | 3 | 4 | 0.750 | 126 | 116 | 1.086 |
| 4 | (Uzbekistan) Mamatsodikova–Tursunpulatova | 3 | 0 | 3 | 3 | 0 | 6 | 0.000 | 48 | 126 | 0.381 |

Source: AVC

| Date | Time | | Score | | Set 1 | Set 2 | Set 3 | Total |
|---|---|---|---|---|---|---|---|---|
| Sep 2 | 15:50 | (Australia) Fleming–Alchin | 2–0 | (Uzbekistan) Mamatsodikova–Tursunpulatova | 21–9 | 21–6 | | 42–15 |
| Sep 2 | 17:30 | (Philippines) Rondina–Pons | 1–2 | (Thailand) S. Patcharaporn–S. Samitta | 13–21 | 21–19 | 13–15 | 47–55 |
| Sep 3 | 9:00 | (Australia) Fleming–Alchin | 2–1 | (Thailand) S. Patcharaporn–S. Samitta | 21–18 | 18–21 | 15–6 | 54–45 |
| Sep 3 | 10:40 | (Philippines) Rondina–Pons | 2–0 | (Uzbekistan) Mamatsodikova–Tursunpulatova | 21–8 | 21–8 | | 42–16 |
| Sep 3 | 19:00 | (Thailand) S. Patcharaporn–S. Samitta | 2–0 | (Uzbekistan) Mamatsodikova–Tursunpulatova | 21–9 | 21–8 | | 42–17 |
| Sep 3 | 20:40 | (Australia) Fleming–Alchin | 2–0 | (Philippines) Rondina–Pons | 24–22 | 21–15 | | 45–37 |

Source: AVC

==== Pool F ====
| Pos | Team | Pld | W | L | Pts | SW | SL | SR | SPW | SPL | SPR |
|---|---|---|---|---|---|---|---|---|---|---|---|
| 1 | (Japan) Ren–Non | 3 | 3 | 0 | 6 | 6 | 0 | MAX | 126 | 80 | 1.575 |
| 2 | (China) Sh.T. Cao–J. Dong | 3 | 2 | 1 | 5 | 4 | 2 | 2.000 | 116 | 78 | 1.487 |
| 3 | (Kazakhstan) Kabulbekova–Ivanchenko | 3 | 1 | 2 | 4 | 2 | 4 | 0.500 | 82 | 106 | 0.774 |
| 4 | (Malaysia) Cadence–Rachael | 3 | 0 | 3 | 3 | 0 | 6 | 0.000 | 66 | 126 | 0.524 |

Source: AVC

| Date | Time | | Score | | Set 1 | Set 2 | Set 3 | Total |
|---|---|---|---|---|---|---|---|---|
| Sep 2 | 15:50 | (Japan) Ren–Non | 2–0 | (Kazakhstan) Kabulbekova–Ivanchenko | 21–14 | 21–12 | | 42–26 |
| Sep 2 | 17:30 | (China) Sh.T. Cao–J. Dong | 2–0 | (Malaysia) Cadence–Rachael | 21–10 | 21–12 | | 42–22 |
| Sep 3 | 9:00 | (Japan) Ren–Non | 2–0 | (Malaysia) Cadence–Rachael | 21–16 | 21–6 | | 42–22 |
| Sep 3 | 10:40 | (China) Sh.T. Cao–J. Dong | 2–0 | (Kazakhstan) Kabulbekova–Ivanchenko | 21–2 | 21–12 | | 42–14 |
| Sep 3 | 19:00 | (Malaysia) Cadence–Rachael | 0–2 | (Kazakhstan) Kabulbekova–Ivanchenko | 12–21 | 10–21 | | 22–42 |
| Sep 3 | 20:40 | (Japan) Ren–Non | 2–0 | (China) Sh.T. Cao–J. Dong | 21–17 | 21–15 | | 42–32 |

Source: AVC

==== Third place rankings ====
| Pos | Grp | Team | Pld | W | L | Pts | SW | SL | SR | SPW | SPL | SPR | Qualification |
|---|---|---|---|---|---|---|---|---|---|---|---|---|---|
| 1 | E | (Philippines) Rondina–Pons | 3 | 1 | 2 | 4 | 3 | 4 | 0.750 | 126 | 116 | 1.086 | Round of 16 |
| 2 | A | (Singapore) Lee X.E.V–Ang H.Y | 3 | 1 | 2 | 4 | 3 | 4 | 0.750 | 99 | 122 | 0.811 | Round of 16 |
| 3 | B | (Hong Kong) W.T. To–W.M. To | 3 | 1 | 2 | 4 | 2 | 4 | 0.500 | 96 | 96 | 1.000 | Round of 18 |
| 4 | C | (Kazakhstan) Karimova–Ryukhova | 3 | 1 | 2 | 4 | 2 | 4 | 0.500 | 97 | 101 | 0.960 | Round of 18 |
| 5 | F | (Kazakhstan) Kabulbekova–Ivanchenko | 3 | 1 | 2 | 4 | 2 | 4 | 0.500 | 82 | 106 | 0.774 | Round of 18 |
| 6 | D | (Vanuatu) Toko–Pata | 3 | 1 | 2 | 4 | 2 | 5 | 0.400 | 108 | 130 | 0.831 | Round of 18 |

Source: AVC

=== Knockout round ===
Round of 18; 4 September
(Kazakhstan) Karimova–Ryukhova | 18 | 15
(Kazakhstan) Kabulbekova–Ivanchenko | 21 | 21
(Hong Kong) W.T. To–W.M. To | 21 | 18 | 14
(Vanuatu) Toko–Pata | 15 | 21 | 16

Round of 16; 4 September
(China) Yan X.–X.Y. Xia | 21 | 21
(Kazakhstan) Kabulbekova–Ivanchenko | 13 | 9
(Thailand) S. Patcharaporn–S. Samitta | 24 | 18
(China) Sh.T. Cao–J. Dong | 26 | 21
(Australia) Fleming–Alchin | 10 | 13
(Thailand) Naraphornrapat–Woranatchayakorn | 21 | 21
(Singapore) Lee X.E.V–Ang H.Y | 19 | 11
(New Zealand) Polley–MacDonald | 21 | 21
(Australia) Fejes–Clancy | 20 | 21 | 15
(Vanuatu) Toko–Pata | 22 | 9 | 6
(Philippines) Progella–Pagara | 21 | 21
(Hong Kong) N.L. Tsang–M.C. Wong | 10 | 15
(Japan) Shiba–Reika | 21 | 25 | 15
(Philippines) Rondina–Pons | 17 | 27 | 6
(New Zealand) Green–Tiplady | 18 | 12
(Japan) Ren–Non | 21 | 21

Quarterfinals; 5 September
(China) Yan X.–X.Y. Xia | 21 | 23
(China) Sh.T. Cao–J. Dong | 17 | 21
(Thailand) Naraphornrapat–Woranatchayakorn | 23 | 21 | 13
(New Zealand) Polley–MacDonald | 25 | 13 | 15
(Australia) Fejes–Clancy | 21 | 21
(Philippines) Progella–Pagara | 11 | 14
(Japan) Shiba–Reika | 21 | 21
(Japan) Ren–Non | 14 | 19

Semifinals; 5 September
(China) Yan X.–X.Y. Xia | 21 | 21
(New Zealand) Polley–MacDonald | 13 | 17
(Australia) Fejes–Clancy | 21 | 21
(Japan) Shiba–Reika | 17 | 17

Final; 6 September
(China) Yan X.–X.Y. Xia | 21 | 16
(Australia) Fejes–Clancy | 23 | 21
3rd place
(New Zealand) Polley–MacDonald | 16 | 13
(Japan) Shiba–Reika | 21 | 21

=== Final standing ===
| Pos. | Team |
|---|---|
| 1st place, gold medalist(s) | (Australia) Fejes–Clancy |
| 2nd place, silver medalist(s) | (China) Yan X.–X.Y. Xia |
| 3rd place, bronze medalist(s) | (Japan) Shiba–Reika |
| 4 | (New Zealand) Polley–MacDonald |
| 5 | (China) Sh.T. Cao–J. Dong |
| 5 | (Japan) Ren–Non |
| 5 | (Philippines) Progella–Pagara |
| 5 | (Thailand) Naraphornrapat–Woranatchayakorn |
| 9 | (Australia) Fleming–Alchin |
| 9 | (Hong Kong) N.L. Tsang–M.C. Wong |
| 9 | (Kazakhstan) Kabulbekova–Ivanchenko |
| 9 | (New Zealand) Green–Tiplady |
| 9 | (Philippines) Rondina–Pons |
| 9 | (Singapore) Lee X.E.V–Ang H.Y |
| 9 | (Thailand) S. Patcharaporn–S. Samitta |
| 9 | (Vanuatu) Toko–Pata |
| 17 | (Hong Kong) W.T. To–W.M. To |
| 17 | (Kazakhstan) Karimova–Ryukhova |
| 19 | (Kyrgyzstan) Rasulbek Kyzy–Kudaikulova |
| 19 | (Malaysia) Cadence–Rachael |
| 19 | (Mongolia) Anudari–Khatanzaya |
| 19 | (Mongolia) Uuganchimeg–Oyuntuya |
| 19 | (Uzbekistan) Mamatsodikova–Tursunpulatova |
| 19 | (Uzbekistan) Shagraeva–Uralova |

| Qualified for the 2028 Summer Olympics |
