= Chris McHugh (beach volleyball) =

Australian beach volleyball player

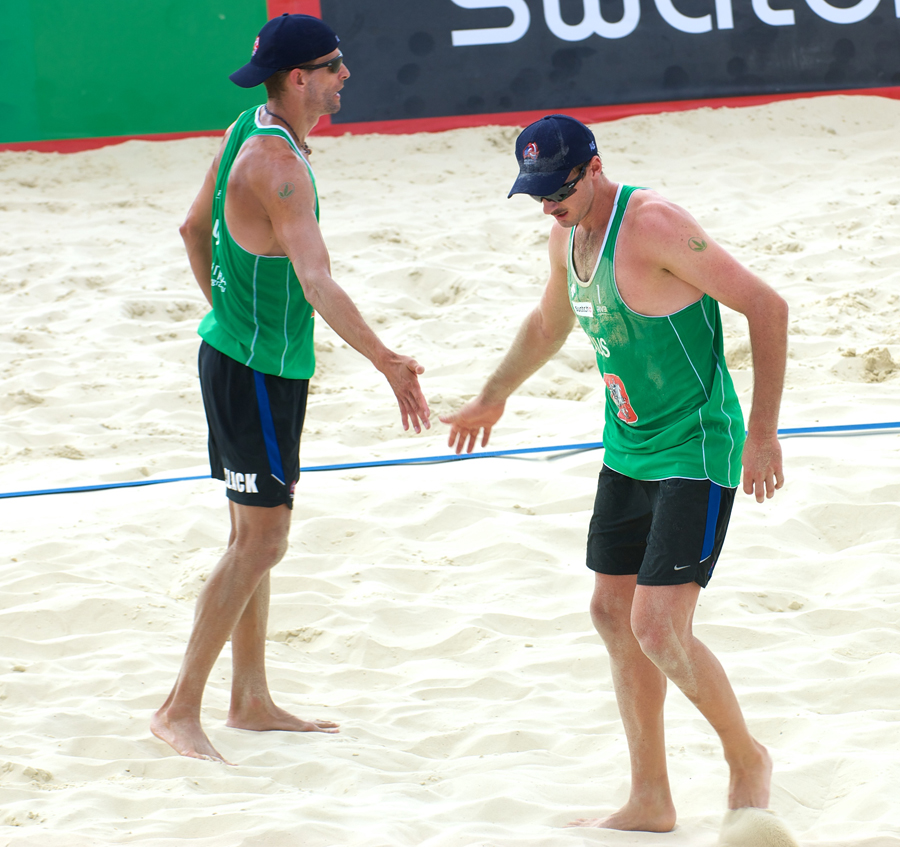

Personal information
- Full name: Christopher McHugh
- Nationality: Australian
- Born: 31 August 1989 (age 37)
- Height: 1.97 m (6 ft 6 in)

Beach volleyball information

Current teammate
Years	Teammate
2021–present	Paul Burnett

Previous teammates
Years	Teammate
2016–2021; 2012–2016; 2010–2012	Damien Schumann; Isaac Kapa; Joshua Slack
Honours
Men's beach volleyball
Representing Australia
Commonwealth Games
Gold medal – first place	2018 Gold Coast	Beach volleyball
Gold medal – first place	2022 Birmingham	Beach volleyball
Volleyball World Beach Pro Tour
Silver medal – second place	2022	Kuşadası Challenge
Bronze medal – third place	2022	Torquay Challenge
FIVB Beach Volleyball World Tour
Gold medal – first place	2020	Phnom Penh
Asian Beach Volleyball Championships
Gold medal – first place	2012	Haikou
Gold medal – first place	2014	Jinjiang
Gold medal – first place	2016	Sydney
Gold medal – first place	2020	Udon Thani
Gold medal – first place	2021	Phuket
Silver medal – second place	2022	Bandar Abbas
Bronze medal – third place	2017	Songkhla

Christopher McHugh (born 31 August 1989) is a male beach volleyball player from Australia. He represented Australia at the 2018 Commonwealth Games on the Gold Coast and the 2020 Summer Olympics in Tokyo, both with teammate Damien Schumann, winning the gold medal at the Commonwealth Games. Unfortunately, competing at the 2020 Olympics, the pair were knocked out in the group stage after finishing at the bottom of their pool.

== Early years ==
In Year 3 at school, McHugh participated in Spikezone Mini Volleyball to avoid clarinet lessons on Wednesday afternoons. McHugh then joined the Henley Hawks Volleyball Club in South Australia. His ambition was to become a first class Beach Volleyball player. McHugh made his professional volleyball debut in 2006, at just 17 years of age.

McHugh studied at St Michael's College in 2007 while training at the Australian Institute of Volleyball. McHugh is now an AIS Share a Yarn Ambassador, a program fostering connections and education with the ATSI (Aboriginal and Torres Strait Islander) community.

== Achievements ==
McHugh competed at the World Championships in 2013, 2015 and 2017. He won his first tournament at the 2012 AVC Beach Volleyball Championships partnering Joshua Slack (now retired). He then had Isaac Kapa as a partner for four years before pairing up with Damien Schumann.

The Schumann/McHugh partnership has been very strong and they won medals four times before their Commonwealth Games debut in 2018. At the Gold Coast 2018 Commonwealth Games, they made the final undefeated. In the gold medal final they defeated Canadian pair Sam Pedlow and Sam Schachter.

Outside of beach volleyball, Chris is vice president of his first club, the Henley Hawks Volleyball Club. Here he helps mentor young athletes, as well as speaking at local schools to encourage early involvement in volleyball.

Since he began competing on the FIVB World Tour in 2006, McHugh has played over 600 matches. He is a six-time Australian Champion.

In 2019 McHugh became a father, with his wife, Denai, giving birth to Jack on 24 September 2019.
