= Nicole Laird =

Australian beach volleyball player (born 1993)

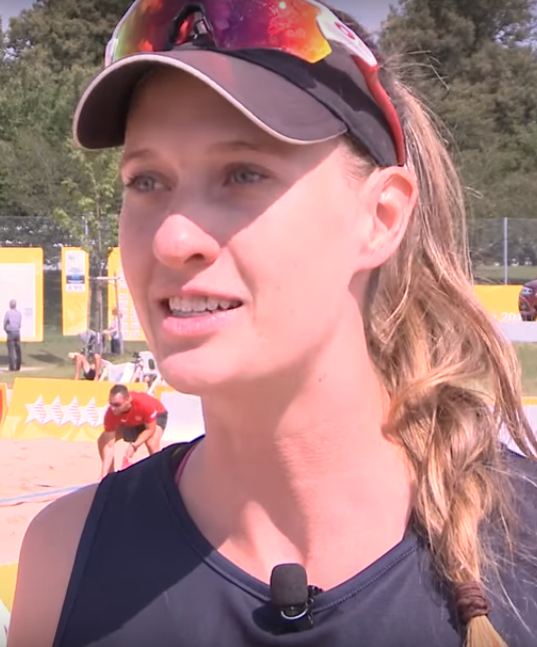
- Laird in 2018

Personal information
- Nationality: Australia
- Born: 18 February 1993 (age 33)
- Height: 191 cm (6 ft 3 in)
- Weight: 75 kg (165 lb)

Beach volleyball information

Current teammate
Years	Teammate
2022–present	Brittany Kendall

Previous teammates
Years	Teammate
2022; 2022; 2019–2021; 2018; 2017; 2017; 2013–2016	Alisha Stevens; Phoebe Bell; Becchara Palmer; Brittany Kendall; Jessyka Ngauamo; Phoebe Bell; Mariafe Artacho del Solar
Honours
Representing Australia
Women's beach volleyball
Volleyball World Beach Pro Tour
Gold medal – first place	2023	Satun Future
Silver medal – second place	2022	Coolangatta Future
FIVB Beach Volleyball World Tour
Gold medal – first place	2019	Sydney Open
Bronze medal – third place	2017	Shepparton Open
Bronze medal – third place	2017	Sydney Open
Asian Beach Volleyball Championships
Silver medal – second place	2016	Sydney
Bronze medal – third place	2017	Songkhla
Bronze medal – third place	2015	Hong Kong

Nicole Laird (born 18 February 1993) is an Australian beach volleyball player. She represented her country at the 2016 Summer Olympics in Rio de Janeiro.

== Professional career ==
=== Rio de Janeiro - 2016 Olympics ===
Laird made her Olympic debut in Rio with her beach volleyball partner Mariafe Artacho del Solar, whom she met while studying at Killara High School. The pair did not win a match in Rio, losing to the U.S., Switzerland and China in their preliminary pool matches to finish the tournament in 19th place.
