= Alice Zeimann =

New Zealand beach volleyball player (born 1998)

Personal information
- Full name: Alice Zeimann
- Nationality: New Zealander
- Born: 28 July 1998 (age 28); Christchurch, New Zealand
- Height: 179 cm (5 ft 10 in)

Beach volleyball information

Current teammate
Years	Teammate
2017–present	Shaunna Polley

Alice Zeimann (born 28 July 1998) is a New Zealand beach volleyball player.

== Biography ==
Zeimann was born in Christchurch, New Zealand and attended Burnside High School. In 2017, she moved to the United States to study at the University of Minnesota, then transferred to Florida State University in 2020.

Zeimann and her playing partner Shaunna Polley represented New Zealand at the 2022 Commonwealth Games.
