= Wang Xinxin (beach volleyball) =

Chinese beach volleyball player (born 1998)

Personal information
- Born: 2 April 1998 (age 28) Dezhou, Shandong, China
- Height: 1.87 m (6 ft 2 in)
Honours
Women's beach volleyball
Representing China
FIVB Pro World Tour
Gold medal – first place	2022 Budapest	Beach
Silver medal – second place	2022 Baden	Beach
Silver medal – second place	2023 Wenzhou	Beach
Silver medal – second place	2023 Qidong	Beach
Bronze medal – third place	2024 Wuhan	Beach
Asian Beach Games
Silver medal – second place	2016 Da Nang	Beach

Wang Xinxin (Chinese: 王鑫鑫; born April 2, 1998) is a Chinese beach volleyball player. She is a competitor at the 2020 Summer Olympics with partner Xue Chen.
