= Zachery Schubert =

Australian beach volleyball player (born 1995)

Personal information
- Born: 23 December 1995 (age 30) Loxton, South Australia, Australia
- Height: 1.98 m (6 ft 6 in)
Beach volleyball information
Current teammate
- Years: Teammate
- 2022–: Thomas Hodges

Zachery "Zac" Schubert (born 23 December 1995) is an Australian beach volleyball player who represented Australia at the 2024 Summer Olympics in men’s beach volleyball. Partnered with Thomas Hodges, he won the Beach Pro Tour Challenge event at Jūrmala in 2023 and the 2023 Asian Beach Volleyball Championship.

== Early life and education ==
Schubert grew up in Loxton, South Australia, and began playing volleyball at school around age 13, inspired in part by his cousin, Olympic hockey gold medallist Grant Schubert. He studied nutrition at the University of South Australia.

== Career ==
=== Junior and national pathway ===
Schubert first competed at elite junior level in 2013 and progressed through South Australian programs to national selection.

Across the 2010s he partnered with several Australian players, including Maximilian Guehrer, Cole Durant and Christopher McHugh, collecting domestic podiums and international main-draw results.

=== Partnership with Thomas Hodges (2022–) ===
After both athletes returned from significant surgeries (Schubert—double knee, Hodges—shoulder), Schubert teamed with Victorian blocker Thomas Hodges in 2022. The pair quickly rose on the Pro Tour, earning multiple podiums and in June 2023 won their first Beach Pro Tour gold at the Jūrmala Challenge in Latvia, then, eleven days later, the Asian Beach Volleyball Championship in China.

=== Paris 2024 Olympics ===
Schubert and Hodges qualified for their Olympic debut at Paris 2024. In group play they faced teams from Poland, Germany and France, finishing third to enter the lucky loser round. They defeated France in their final pool match to stay alive, before falling to the United States pair Miles Evans / Chase Budinger in straight sets (21–19, 21–17). They finished equal 17th overall.

== Playing style ==
Schubert plays primarily as a defender alongside the taller Hodges. Media and federation profiles highlight his speed and court coverage, complemented by a high-tempo transition game.

== Personal life ==
Outside volleyball, Schubert founded Schubugs, a cricket farm located about 10 km outside Loxton; the venture, now managed by his father Tim, grew from a single shipping-container setup into a larger operation with a focus on sustainable protein and animal feed.

== Career highlights ==
- Beach Pro Tour Challenge – Gold: Jūrmala (2023, with Thomas Hodges).
- Asian Beach Volleyball Championship – Gold: Pingtan/Fuzhou (2023, with Thomas Hodges).
- Paris 2024 Olympian (17th place, with Thomas Hodges).
