= Phoebe Bell =

Australian female volleyball player

Personal information
- Nationality: Australian
- Born: 22 December 1996 (age 29)
- Hometown: Brisbane, Queensland
- Height: 1.83 m (6 ft)
- Weight: 66 kg (146 lb)
- Spike: 310 cm (122 in)
- Block: 295 cm (116 in)
- Education: Boise State (2015)

Beach volleyball information

Current teammate
Years	Teammate
2021–present	Georgia Johnson

Previous teammates
Years	Teammate
2017–2020	Jessyka Ngauamo

Indoor volleyball information
- Number: 2 (national team)

Career
Years	Teams
2015	Queensland Pirates

National team
2015	Australia
Honours
Representing Australia
Women's beach volleyball
Volleyball World Beach Pro Tour
Silver medal – second place	2022	Coolangatta Future
FIVB Beach Volleyball World Tour
Gold medal – first place	2018	Daegu Open
Bronze medal – third place	2018	Nantong Open
Bronze medal – third place	2018	Langkawi Open
Asian Beach Volleyball Championships
Bronze medal – third place	2021	Phuket
Bronze medal – third place	2019	Maoming
Bronze medal – third place	2017	Songkhla

Phoebe Bell (born 22 December 1996) is an Australian female volleyball and beach volleyball player.

She participated in the 2015 FIVB Volleyball World Grand Prix. At club level she played for Queensland Pirates in 2015. That year Bell also played one season of indoor volleyball during her first year at Boise State University.
