= Megumi Murakami (beach volleyball) =

Japanese beach volleyball player (born 1985)

Personal information
- Nationality: Japan
- Born: 14 September 1985 (age 40) Echizen, Japan
- Height: 1.65 m (5 ft 5 in)

Sport
- Sport: Beach volleyball

Megumi Murakami (村上めぐみ, born 14 September 1985) is a Japanese beach volleyball player. She competed in the 2020 Summer Olympics.
