= Thomas Hodges (volleyball) =

Australian volleyball player (born 1994)

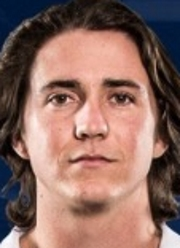

Personal information
- Nationality: Australian
- Born: 4 July 1994 (age 32)
- Height: 197 cm (6 ft 6 in)
- Weight: 95 kg (209 lb)
- Spike: 350 cm (138 in)
- Block: 338 cm (133 in)

Volleyball information
- Number: 25 (national team)

Career
- Years: Team
- 2015: UC Irvine

National team
- Years: Team
- 2015: Australia
Honours
Men's beach volleyball
Representing Australia
Volleyball World Beach Pro Tour
| Gold medal – first place | 2026 | Nuvali Challenge |
| Gold medal – first place | 2023 | Jurmala Challenge |
| Silver medal – second place | 2024 | Haikou Challenge |
| Silver medal – second place | 2023 | Nuvali Challenge |
| Silver medal – second place | 2022 | Torquay Elite 16 |
| Silver medal – second place | 2022 | Cervia Future |
| Bronze medal – third place | 2023 | Haikou Challenge |
| Bronze medal – third place | 2022 | Coolangatta Future |
| Bronze medal – third place | 2022 | Ljubljana Future |

Thomas Hodges (born 4 July 1994) is an Australian male beach volleyball player. He was a former member of the Australia men's indoor volleyball team. On club level he played for UC Irvine. School: Heathdale Christian College
