= Damien Schumann =

Australian beach volleyball player

Personal information
- Nationality: Australian
- Born: 12 November 1987 (age 38); Melbourne, Australia
- Height: 1.83 m (6 ft 0 in)

Beach volleyball information

Current teammate
Teammate
Chris McHugh
Honours
Men's beach volleyball
Representing Australia
Commonwealth Games
Gold medal – first place	2018 Gold Coast	Beach
FIVB Beach Volleyball World Tour
Gold medal – first place	2020	Phnom Penh

Damien Schumann (born 12 November 1987) is a male beach volleyball player from Australia.

He represented Australia at the 2018 Commonwealth Games at the Gold Coast and the 2020 Summer Olympics in Tokyo, both with teammate Chris McHugh, winning the gold medal at the Commonwealth Games. Competing at the 2020 Olympics, the pair were knocked out in the group stage after finishing at the bottom of their pool.

== Early years ==
Schumann began playing volleyball in high school. In his ninth grade at school he decided to concentrate on beach volleyball. He began playing for Australia alongside Owen Boland, with whom he was teammates for three years.

Schumann then paired up with Joshua Court from 2013 until the end of the 2016 season. He then paired up with Chris McHugh for the first time in 2017 but also competed with Cole Durant.

Schumann studied Industrial Design at Swinburne University of Technology, Melbourne, Victoria. He now trains at the South Australian Sports Institute in Adelaide, South Australia.

== Achievements ==
Damien has been voted the Best Defender in Australia, Best Male International Player in 2017 and was a part of the best ranked Team in Asia/Oceania that year.

The Schumann/McHugh partnership has been very strong and they won medals four times before their Commonwealth Games debut in 2018. At the Gold Coast 2018 Commonwealth Games, they made the final undefeated. In the gold medal final they defeated Canadian pair Sam Pedlow and Sam Schachter.
