= Sherysyn Toko =

Vanuatuan beach volleyball player

Personal information
- Born: 10 August 1997 (age 28)
- Height: 1.70 m (5 ft 7 in)
- Weight: 67 kg (148 lb)

Sport
- Country: Vanuatu
- Sport: Beach volleyball
Medal record
Women's beach volleyball
Representing Vanuatu
Commonwealth Games
Bronze medal – third place	2022 Birmingham	Tournament

Sherysyn Toko (born 10 August 1997) is a Vanuatuan beach volleyball player. She combined with Miller Pata to represent Vanuatu in beach volleyball at the 2022 Commonwealth Games, winning a bronze medal.

Toko competed at the 2020 Beach Volleyball World Tour.
