= Shaunna Polley =

New Zealand beach volleyball player (born 1993)

Personal information
- Full name: Shaunna Marie Polley
- Nationality: New Zealander
- Born: 14 December 1993 (age 32)
- Height: 172 cm (5 ft 8 in)

Beach volleyball information

Current teammate
Years	Teammate
2017–present	Alice Zeimann
Medal record
Representing New Zealand
Women's beach volleyball
FIVB Beach Volleyball World Tour
Bronze medal – third place	2017	Ulsan Open

Shaunna Marie Polley (born 14 December 1993) is a New Zealand beach volleyball player.

Polley was in the New Zealand's first women's beach volleyball team to compete at the Games in 2018 with then partner Kelsie Wills. The pair won a bronze medal at the Ulsan Open in South Korea on the 2017 FIVB Beach Volleyball World Tour.

Polley and playing partner Alice Zeimann will be representing New Zealand at the 2022 Commonwealth Games.
