= Sailing at the 2009 Asian Youth Games =

- Venue: National Sailing Centre
- Dates: 30 June – 6 July 2009

The sailing competition in the 2009 Asian Youth Games was held at the National Sailing Centre in Singapore between 30 June and 6 July 2009.

== Medalists ==
Event	Gold	Silver	Bronze
Boys' Techno 293	Wei Bipeng; China	Nakaret Vantana; Thailand	Kim Chan-eui; South Korea
Byte CII	Darren Choy; Singapore	Supakon Pongwichean; Thailand	Amirul Shafiq; Malaysia
Girls' Techno 293	Siripon Kaewduang-ngam; Thailand	Hao Xiumei; China	Audrey Yong; Singapore
Byte CII	Jittiwa Thanawitwilat; Thailand	Najwa Jumali; Singapore	Gu Min; China
Mixed team	Thailand; Nakaret Vantana; Supakon Pongwichean; Siripon Kaewduang-ngam; Jittiwa Thanawitwilat	China; Wei Bipeng; Lu Tianhong; Hao Xiumei; Gu Min	Singapore; Chuah Jun Ler; Darren Choy; Audrey Yong; Najwa Jumali

== Medal table ==
Rank	Nation	Gold	Silver	Bronze	Total
1	Thailand (THA)	3	2	0	5
2	China (CHN)	1	2	1	4
3	Singapore (SIN)	1	1	2	4
4	Malaysia (MAS)	0	0	1	1
4	South Korea (KOR)	0	0	1	1
Totals (5 entries)		5	5	5	15

== Results ==
=== Boys' Techno 293 ===
30 June – 6 July

Rank	Athlete	Race											Total
Rank	Athlete	1	2	3	4	5	6	7	8	9	10	11	Total
1st place, gold medalist(s)	Wei Bipeng (CHN)	1	1	1	1	1	1	1	1	1	1	~~(1)~~	10
2nd place, silver medalist(s)	Nakaret Vantana (THA)	4	4	2	2	3	4	~~(4)~~	2	2	2	2	27
3rd place, bronze medalist(s)	Kim Chan-eui (KOR)	2	2	3	3	4	5	2	4	4	~~(5)~~	3	32
4	Kwok Tsz Him (HKG)	3	3	4	5	2	3	3	3	~~(5)~~	3	4	33
5	I Ketut Shasha Krishna Murti (INA)	7	5	7	7	6	2	6	~~(8)~~	6	4	5	55
6	Chuah Jun Ler (SIN)	5	7	6	6	5	6	5	6	3	7	~~(7)~~	56
7	Daiya Kuramochi (JPN)	6	6	5	4	7	7	7	5	~~(7)~~	6	6	59

=== Boys' Byte CII ===
30 June – 6 July

Rank	Athlete	Race											Total
Rank	Athlete	1	2	3	4	5	6	7	8	9	10	11	Total
1st place, gold medalist(s)	Darren Choy (SIN)	1	1	1	~~(2)~~	1	1	2	1	1	1	1	11
2nd place, silver medalist(s)	Supakon Pongwichean (THA)	2	2	4	1	2	2	1	2	2	3	~~(13)~~	21
3rd place, bronze medalist(s)	Amirul Shafiq (MAS)	~~(7)~~	3	5	3	3	5	3	4	4	2	2	34
4	Aprinanda Hasbula Simamora (INA)	~~(8)~~	4	3	7	5	3	6	3	3	4	4	42
5	Lu Tianhong (CHN)	4	6	2	~~(12)~~	4	7	5	6	5	5	9	53
6	Faisal Abdulla (BRN)	10	5	6	5	6	~~(13)~~	7	7	6	6	5	63
7	Yuichiro Kitamura (JPN)	6	8	8	4	8	8	4	8	~~(10)~~	8	3	65
8	Saif Ibrahim Al-Hammadi (UAE)	5	7	9	6	7	6	~~(13)~~	11	7	9	6	73
9	Nurlan Azatbek Uulu (KGZ)	3	9	7	8	10	4	10	10	9	~~(13)~~	10	80
10	Nam Wan-ryong (KOR)	9	11	10	10	11	11	~~(13)~~	9	8	7	8	94
11	Faris Al-Bakri (QAT)	11	10	12	9	9	10	8	5	11	10	~~(13)~~	95
12	Muhammad Mustafa Ahmed (PAK)	12	12	11	11	~~(13)~~	9	9	12	12	11	7	106

=== Girls' Techno 293 ===
30 June – 6 July

Rank	Athlete	Race											Total
Rank	Athlete	1	2	3	4	5	6	7	8	9	10	11	Total
1st place, gold medalist(s)	Siripon Kaewduang-ngam (THA)	2	1	1	~~(3)~~	1	1	1	1	1	1	2	12
2nd place, silver medalist(s)	Hao Xiumei (CHN)	1	2	2	1	4	4	~~(4)~~	2	2	2	1	21
3rd place, bronze medalist(s)	Audrey Yong (SIN)	4	4	3	2	3	2	2	3	~~(6)~~	4	3	30
4	Man Ka Kei (HKG)	3	3	4	4	2	3	3	4	3	3	~~(4)~~	32
5	Naomi Jones (JPN)	5	5	5	5	5	5	5	5	4	5	~~(5)~~	49

=== Girls' Byte CII ===
30 June – 6 July

Rank	Athlete	Race											Total
Rank	Athlete	1	2	3	4	5	6	7	8	9	10	11	Total
1st place, gold medalist(s)	Jittiwa Thanawitwilat (THA)	2	1	2	1	2	2	3	1	3	3	~~(10)~~	20
2nd place, silver medalist(s)	Najwa Jumali (SIN)	1	5	5	2	1	3	4	2	1	1	~~(10)~~	25
3rd place, bronze medalist(s)	Gu Min (CHN)	3	2	1	~~(10)~~	3	4	1	5	4	2	2	27
4	Khairunneeta Afendy (MAS)	5	3	4	~~(10)~~	4	1	2	3	2	4	1	29
5	Sera Nagamatsu (JPN)	6	4	3	7	7	5	7	4	5	5	~~(10)~~	53
6	Gelis Raya Sanjaya (INA)	4	6	6	4	5	6	8	~~(9)~~	6	7	4	56
7	Pulwasha Salahuddin Khattak (PAK)	8	7	8	3	8	7	5	7	~~(9)~~	6	3	62
8	Jeon Eun-hae (KOR)	7	8	7	5	6	8	6	8	8	8	~~(10)~~	71
9	Alaa Amro Shouhdy (QAT)	9	9	9	6	9	10	9	6	7	9	~~(10)~~	83

=== Mixed team ===
30 June – 6 July

Rank	Team	Boys		Girls		Total
Rank	Team	T293	BCII	T293	BCII	Total
1st place, gold medalist(s)	Thailand (THA)	6	11	5	9	31
2nd place, silver medalist(s)	China (CHN)	7	8	4	7	26
3rd place, bronze medalist(s)	Singapore (SIN)	2	12	3	8	25
4	Malaysia (MAS)		10		6	16
5	Indonesia (INA)	3	9		4	16
6	Japan (JPN)	1	6	1	5	13
7	South Korea (KOR)	5	3		2	10
8	Bahrain (BRN)		7			7
9	Hong Kong (HKG)	4		2		6
10	United Arab Emirates (UAE)		5			5
11	Pakistan (PAK)		1		3	4
12	Kyrgyzstan (KGZ)		4			4
13	Qatar (QAT)		2		1	3
