= Diving at the 2009 Asian Youth Games =

- Venue: Toa Payoh Swimming Complex
- Dates: 30 June – 1 July 2009

Diving at the 2009 Asian Youth Games was held in the Toa Payoh Swimming Complex in Singapore from 30 June to 1 July 2009.

== Medalists ==
=== Boys ===
Event	Gold	Silver	Bronze
3 m springboard	Wu Dongliang; China	Rashid Al-Harbi; Kuwait	Cho Sung-in; South Korea
Platform	Zhang Yanquan; China	Lee Tae-kyun; South Korea	Hyon Il-myong; North Korea

=== Girls ===
Event	Gold	Silver	Bronze
3 m springboard	Kim Na-mi; South Korea	Lei Sio I Macau	Liu Tian; China
Platform	Liu Jiao; China	Sin Ji-hyang; North Korea	Yun Seung-eun; South Korea

== Medal table ==
Rank	Nation	Gold	Silver	Bronze	Total
1	China (CHN)	3	0	1	4
2	South Korea (KOR)	1	1	2	4
3	North Korea (PRK)	0	1	1	2
4	Kuwait (KUW)	0	1	0	1
4	Macau (MAC)	0	1	0	1
Totals (5 entries)		4	4	4	12

== Results ==
=== Boys ===
==== 3 m springboard ====
30 June

Rank	Athlete	Prel.	Final
1st place, gold medalist(s)	Wu Dongliang (CHN)	599.50	626.60
2nd place, silver medalist(s)	Rashid Al-Harbi (KUW)	479.95	474.95
3rd place, bronze medalist(s)	Cho Sung-in (KOR)	496.10	474.05
4	Ali Ospan (KAZ)	394.30	417.80
5	Yumnam Hemjit Metei (IND)	398.90	397.70
6	Hamid Karimi (IRI)	391.30	372.40
7	Andriyan (INA)	321.20	347.25
8	Tun Nyi Nyi (MYA)	311.35	318.75
9	Salim Al-Masroori (OMA)	285.00	300.85
10	Sittichok Jantardon (THA)	291.10	289.90

==== Platform ====
1 July

Rank	Athlete	Prel.	Final
1st place, gold medalist(s)	Zhang Yanquan (CHN)	558.45	633.45
2nd place, silver medalist(s)	Lee Tae-kyun (KOR)	446.75	461.50
3rd place, bronze medalist(s)	Hyun Il-myong (PRK)	482.60	452.10
4	Ali Shakoul (IRI)	402.30	380.75
5	Hamad Saleh (KUW)	339.00	368.75
6	Ali Ospan (KAZ)	335.25	348.45
7	Ketan Mukundrao Shinde (IND)	316.55	342.30
8	Andriyan (INA)	345.70	338.40
9	Tun Nyi Nyi (MYA)	278.80	314.30
10	Hafidh Al-Harthi (OMA)	241.30	244.00

=== Girls ===
==== 3 m springboard ====
1 July

Rank	Athlete	Prel.	Final
1st place, gold medalist(s)	Kim Na-mi (KOR)	367.45	357.20
2nd place, silver medalist(s)	Lei Sio I (MAC)	411.35	350.45
3rd place, bronze medalist(s)	Liu Tian (CHN)	480.80	342.15
4	Natassia Marie Nalus (PHI)	301.10	281.75
5	Đặng Trần Anh (VIE)	299.60	266.45
6	Maria Natalie Dinda (INA)	271.20	250.60
7	Anastasiya Khomenkova (UZB)	274.20	236.30
—	Nyunt Soe Sandar (MYA)	151.80	DNS

==== Platform ====
30 June

Rank	Athlete	Prel.	Final
1st place, gold medalist(s)	Liu Jiao (CHN)	474.05	492.05
2nd place, silver medalist(s)	Sin Ji-hyang (PRK)	445.70	459.15
3rd place, bronze medalist(s)	Yun Seung-eun (KOR)	364.85	392.90
4	Maria Natalie Dinda (INA)	275.60	294.60
5	Anastasiya Khomenkova (UZB)	256.70	250.30
6	Nyunt Soe Sandar (MYA)	210.65	239.85
