= Shooting at the 2009 Asian Youth Games =

- Venue: SAFRA Yishun Country Club
- Dates: 1–4 July 2009

The Shooting competition in the 2009 Asian Youth Games was held at SAFRA Yishun Country Club in Singapore between 1 July and 4 July 2009.

== Medalists ==
=== Boys ===
Event	Gold	Silver	Bronze
10 m air pistol	Choi Dae-han; South Korea	Zhang Jie; China	Yakov Donguzov; Kazakhstan
10 m air rifle	Wu Jianing; China	Gao Tingjie; China	Abel Lim; Singapore

=== Girls ===
Event	Gold	Silver	Bronze
10 m air pistol	Kim Jang-mi; South Korea	Zhang Lei; China	Bae Yu-in; South Korea
10 m air rifle	Zhong Chunchan; China	Go Do-won; South Korea	Hessah Al-Zayed; Kuwait

== Medal table ==
Rank	Nation	Gold	Silver	Bronze	Total
1	China (CHN)	2	3	0	5
2	South Korea (KOR)	2	1	1	4
3	Kazakhstan (KAZ)	0	0	1	1
3	Kuwait (KUW)	0	0	1	1
3	Singapore (SIN)	0	0	1	1
Totals (5 entries)		4	4	4	12

== Results ==
=== Boys ===
==== 10 m air pistol ====
4 July

Rank	Athlete	Qual.	Final
1st place, gold medalist(s)	Choi Dae-han (KOR)	577	675.9
2nd place, silver medalist(s)	Zhang Jie (CHN)	573	672.5
3rd place, bronze medalist(s)	Yakov Donguzov (KAZ)	566	663.6
4	Wang Liang-chun (TPE)	564	663.5
5	Kim Song-chol (PRK)	564	663.4
6	Kim Geun-bok (KOR)	564	662.4
7	Ajitesh Kaushal (IND)	559^{49.0}	658.3
8	Sepehr Saffari (IRI)	559^{51.1}	656.6
9	Tien Shao-chien (TPE)	559^{47.0}	
10	Sachin Chauhan (IND)	557	
11	Wang Mengyi (CHN)	557	
12	Tawatchai Buayoo (THA)	556	
13	Ravshan Kashapov (UZB)	553	
14	Daniyar Turgambekov (KAZ)	552	
15	Bader Al-Tayar (KUW)	551	
16	Mark Mañosca (PHI)	550	
17	Bùi Hồng Phong (VIE)	549	
18	Diana Putra Kadek (INA)	548	
19	Dominic Cheong (SIN)	547	
20	Hoong Shi Xiang (SIN)	546	
21	Nattaporn Chaimongkol (THA)	543	
22	Ahmad Al-Obaidan (KUW)	542	
23	Baigalmaagiin Uilsbold (MGL)	540	
24	Chang Sai Hou (MAC)	535	
25	Jalil Sydykov (KGZ)	534	
26	Oyuuny Tögöldör (MGL)	534	
27	Obaid Al-Qaydi (UAE)	529	
28	Mohammed Fahad Al-Kuwari (QAT)	524	
29	Mohamed Al-Qaydi (UAE)	524	
30	Trần Quốc Bình (VIE)	512	
31	Ali Tammari (IRI)	508	
—	Choo Wen Yan (MAS)	DNS	
—	Johnathan Wong (MAS)	DNS	
—	Daniil Belinov (KGZ)	DNS	

==== 10 m air rifle ====
2 July

Rank	Athlete	Qual.	Final
1st place, gold medalist(s)	Wu Jianing (CHN)	587	686.2^{10.5}
2nd place, silver medalist(s)	Gao Tingjie (CHN)	584	686.2^{10.3}
3rd place, bronze medalist(s)	Abel Lim (SIN)	585	685.6
4	Kim Yong (KOR)	586	685.2
5	Navdeep Singh Rathore (IND)	583	685.0
6	Wan Tian Chong (SIN)	583	684.5
7	Kim Yeong-jae (KOR)	581	684.3
8	Supanit Bunpipak (THA)	580^{49.3}	679.6
9	Shovon Chowdhury (BAN)	580^{48.9}	
10	Anton Ignatenko (KAZ)	578	
11	Dugaryn Mönkh-Onon (MGL)	577	
12	Wang Wei-lin (TPE)	574	
13	Mahmodul Hasan (BAN)	573	
14	Nguyễn Thành Nam (VIE)	570	
15	Tanapon Jarunya (THA)	568	
16	Nooruz Akbar Uulu (KGZ)	567	
17	Jayson Valdez (PHI)	566	
18	Vincent Edis Koeswanto (INA)	566	
19	Mohamed Al-Shehhi (UAE)	565	
20	Salem Al-Qaydi (UAE)	561	
21	Hamad Abutuaimeh (QAT)	560	
22	Mohammed Al-Sunaidi (QAT)	560	
23	Pouria Norouzian (IRI)	559	
24	Shubham Malik (IND)	558	
25	Daniil Shenshin (KGZ)	557	
26	Chung Yang-yeh (TPE)	554	
27	Majid Najafi (IRI)	551	
28	Nguyễn Toàn Trung (VIE)	550	
29	Allen Pinlac (PHI)	545	
—	Amin Hamzah (MAS)	DNS	
—	Mohd Zubair Mohammad (MAS)	DNS	
—	Baatarsürengiin Javkhlan (MGL)	DNS	

=== Girls ===
==== 10 m air pistol ====
3 July

Rank	Athlete	Qual.	Final
1st place, gold medalist(s)	Kim Jang-mi (KOR)	381	480.7
2nd place, silver medalist(s)	Zhang Lei (CHN)	382	476.3
3rd place, bronze medalist(s)	Bae Yu-in (KOR)	378	476.0
4	Fang Xue (CHN)	379	475.4^{10.7}
5	Yu Ai-wen (TPE)	379	475.4^{10.1}
6	Kanokkan Chaimongkol (THA)	374	474.1
7	Byambyn Agiimaa (MGL)	372	468.1
8	Nguyễn Thị Ngọc Dương (VIE)	373	467.0
9	Carene Loo (SIN)	371	
10	Bakhtigul Makhmadova (KGZ)	368	
11	Pattarasuda Sowsanga (THA)	367	
12	Mina Barani (IRI)	367	
13	Teh Xiu Hong (SIN)	365	
14	Surabhi Pathak (IND)	363	
15	Shanin Lyn Gonzales (PHI)	361	
16	Czarmainne Trajano (PHI)	360	
17	Nikita Gupta (IND)	359	
18	Pun Ka Man (MAC)	357	
19	Chao Mei Kam (MAC)	357	
20	Yasaman Heidari (IRI)	357	
21	Davaasürengiin Enkhzul (MGL)	357	
22	Bùi Thị Le (VIE)	353	
23	Lenara Asanova (UZB)	353	
24	Risky Elisa Putri (INA)	352	
25	Mashaal Al-Buyaradah (QAT)	349	
26	Fatema Al-Khadhari (KUW)	298	
—	Jamiah Maidin (MAS)	DNS	
—	Noor Izzati Jasni (MAS)	DNS	
—	Aigerim Melisbek Kyzy (KGZ)	DNS	
—	Ghzlan Hasan (KUW)	DNS	

==== 10 m air rifle ====
1 July

Rank	Athlete	Qual.	Final
1st place, gold medalist(s)	Zhong Chunchan (CHN)	396	499.5
2nd place, silver medalist(s)	Go Do-won (KOR)	395	498.6
3rd place, bronze medalist(s)	Hessah Al-Zayed (KUW)	395	497.8
4	Ayonika Paul (IND)	397	497.6
5	Jodie Tan (SIN)	395	496.3
6	Donyapan Thiranuwattanakul (THA)	391^{50.9}	495.2
7	Zhang Jinwei (CHN)	393	494.8
8	Sadiya Sultana (BAN)	392	493.4
9	Goh Jia Yi (SIN)	391^{50.8}	
10	Gankhuyagiin Nandinzayaa (MGL)	389	
11	Neha Milind Sapte (IND)	389	
12	Mariya Filimonova (UZB)	389	
13	Kim Jin-a (KOR)	388	
14	Bahiya Al-Hamad (QAT)	387	
15	Yelizaveta Lunina (KAZ)	387	
16	Batsaikhany Lkham (MGL)	385	
17	Dianne Eufemio (PHI)	385	
18	Sneh Rana (NEP)	385	
19	Noushin Shahbazifard (IRI)	384	
20	Ryu Hyo-sim (PRK)	383	
21	Manchulika Manakit (THA)	385	
22	Phạm Thị Châu (VIE)	383	
23	Wasmiya Al-Abdulla (QAT)	383	
24	Maedeh Aminzadeh (IRI)	382	
25	Tripti Datta (BAN)	382	
26	Kartika Ika (INA)	382	
27	Sabina Ismailova (KGZ)	382	
28	Yuliya Khlyzova (KAZ)	380	
29	Juhi Chaudhary (NEP)	380	
30	Aisuluu Kurmanbek Kyzy (KGZ)	372	
31	An Thị Thùy Linh (VIE)	368	
32	Fatouh Mohammad (KUW)	368	
33	Isabelle Eufemio (PHI)	366	
—	Nur Izzati Sabki (MAS)	DNS	
—	Faezaton Elmia Kamal (MAS)	DNS	
