= Bangladesh at the 2009 Asian Youth Games =

- IOC code: BAN
- NOC: Bangladesh Olympic Association

in Singapore
- Competitors: 12 in 4 sports
- Medals: Gold 0 Silver 0 Bronze 0 Total 0

Asian Youth Games appearances
- 2009; 2013; 2025

Bangladesh competed at the 2009 Asian Youth Games held in Singapore from June 29 to July 7, 2009. Total 12 athletes form Bangladesh participated in 4 events, 3-on-3 Basketball, Athletics, Shooting and Swimming.

== Medalists ==
Bangladesh did not win any medal in 2009 Asian Youth Games.

== Basketball ==
=== Boys (Group A) ===
Team	Pld	W	L	PF	PA	PD	Pts
Thailand	3	3	0	85	45	+40	6
United Arab Emirates	3	2	1	84	47	+37	5
Palestine	3	1	2	75	67	+8	4
Bangladesh	3	0	3	14	99	−85	3

July 2
9:00

United Arab Emirates	33–6	Bangladesh
Pts: Al-Wali 16		Pts: Mahmud 6

Anglican High School, Singapore

July 2
16:30

Bangladesh	4–33	Thailand
Pts: Obayeda 3		Pts: Rattanapansri 11

Anglican High School, Singapore

July 3
10:30

Palestine	33–4	Bangladesh
Pts: Habash 16		Pts: Mahmud, Obayeda 2

Anglican High School, Singapore

- Bangladesh did not advance in next stage.

== Athletics ==
=== Boys ===
Event	Athletes	Heats		Final	
Event	Athletes	Time	Rank	Time	Rank
100 m	Mesbah Ahmmed	11.76	7th	did not advance	

=== Girls ===
Event	Athletes	Heats		Final	
Event	Athletes	Time	Rank	Time	Rank
100 m	Shirin Akter	13.30	5th	did not advance	

== Shooting ==
=== Boys ===
Event	Athlete	Qualification		Final	
Event	Athlete	Score	Rank	Score	Rank
Boys 10 m air rifle	Shovon Chowdhury	580^{48.9}	9th	did not advance	
Boys 10 m air rifle	Mahmodul Hasan	573	13th	did not advance	

=== Girls ===
Event	Athlete	Qualification		Final	
Event	Athlete	Score	Rank	Score	Rank
Girls 10 m air rifle	Sadiya Sultana	392	8th	493.4	8th
Girls 10 m air rifle	Tripti Datta	382	25th	did not advance	

== Swimming ==
=== Boys ===
Athlete(s)	Event	Heats		Semifinals		Final	
Athlete(s)	Event	Result	Rank	Result	Rank	Result	Rank
50 m freestyle	Mahfizur Rahman	25.31	13th	25.45	15th	did not advance	
100 m freestyle	Mahfizur Rahman	55.84	19th	did not advance			
200 m freestyle	Mahfizur Rahman	2:03.65	20th	did not advance			
50 m butterfly	Anik Islam	27.32	12th	did not advance			
100 m butterfly	Anik Islam	1:01.10	20th	did not advance			
