= Athletics at the 2009 Asian Youth Games =

- Venue: Bishan Stadium
- Dates: 30 June – 3 July 2009

The athletics competition in the 2009 Asian Youth Games were held at the Bishan Stadium in Singapore between 30 June and 3 July 2009. Each country is limited to having 6 boys and 6 girls for the entire competition.

== Medalists ==
=== Boys ===
Event	Gold		Silver		Bronze	
100 m	Masaki Nashimoto; Japan	10.82	Kittisak Phiraksa; Thailand	11.11	Shahrir Anuar; Singapore	11.13
400 m	Masanori Oishi; Japan	48.92	Nitipol Thongpoon; Thailand	49.27	Abdullah Ahmed Abkar; Saudi Arabia	49.29
800 m	Ravi Kumar; India	1:55.91	Amir Beiranvand; Iran	1:55.93	Indunil Herath; Sri Lanka	1:56.33
1500 m	Waleed Elayah; Yemen	4:00.91	Rahul Kumar; India	4:05.01	Amir Beiranvand; Iran	4:05.32
110 m hurdles	Lu Jiateng; China	13.96	Nader Al-Haydar; Saudi Arabia	14.12	Wu Han-wei; Chinese Taipei	14.52
400 m hurdles	Chen Dong; China	53.19	Selwyn Jebaraj Mervin; India	54.41	Yousef Karam; Kuwait	54.80
4 × 200 m relay	Thailand; Pongskorn Sopakorn; Nitipol Thongpoon; Kittisak Phiraksa; Jirapong Meenapra	1:27.89	Sri Lanka; Madushanka Athawuda; Heshan Amarasinghe; Ashen Fernando; Dulaj Lahiru	1:32.57	Bahrain; Ali Omar Al-Doseri; Ali Abdulla; Yunes Asabeel; Faisal Mohamed	1:33.80
High jump	Ren Wei; China	2.02	Kim Yeon-jae; South Korea	2.00	Sergey Oleshko; Kazakhstan	2.00
Pole vault	Sho Hibasa; Japan	4.81	Chi Chien-hao; Chinese Taipei	4.30	Sean Lim; Singapore	4.30
Long jump	Huang Haibing; China	7.28	Pang Ying Kit; Hong Kong	6.81	Mohammed Al-Hasan; Saudi Arabia	6.68
Triple jump	Konstantin Kudryashov; Kazakhstan	14.80	Yan Tun; China	14.59	Ruslan Kurbanov; Uzbekistan	14.59
Shot put	Li Jun; China	19.45	Mehdi Kargarnejad; Iran	16.76	Panyawut Bumroong; Thailand	15.95
Discus throw	Arjun; India	58.72	Kenta Akiba; Japan	51.84	Yevgeniy Milovatskiy; Kazakhstan	51.73
Javelin throw	Rohit Kumar; India	74.70	Cheng Chao-tsun; Chinese Taipei	71.97	Raheem Khan; Pakistan	60.73

=== Girls ===
Event	Gold		Silver		Bronze	
100 m	Lee Sun-ae; South Korea	12.16	Akane Kimura; Japan	12.36	He Jiawen; China	12.44
400 m	Benjamas Yuadthong; Thailand	57.38	Elina Mikhina; Kazakhstan	57.73	Hsu Yu-wen; Chinese Taipei	58.01
800 m	Namita Kabat; India	2:15.55	Cà Thị Thận; Vietnam	2:20.43	Myint Swe Li; Myanmar	2:22.14
1500 m	Li Zhixuan; China	4:34.44	Ko Yong-sim; North Korea	4:36.80	Pooja Varhade; India	4:39.04
100 m hurdles	Mayu Ueda; Japan	14.18	Park Seui-gi; South Korea	14.67	Inez Leong; Singapore	15.22
400 m hurdles	Cheng Yafan; China	1:02.15	Lê Bình Định; Vietnam	1:02.79	Mekala Sushma; India	1:03.44
4 × 200 m relay	Thailand; Patcharapan Sakporm; Supawan Thipat; Gedsuda Kumklieng; Benjamas Yuadthong	1:41.29	Japan; Mayu Ueda; Manami Date; Misaki Kuroiwa; Akane Kimura	1:44.36	Sri Lanka; Akshana Maralanda; Nadeeshani Henderson; Nimesha Siriwardhana; Pabasara Senanayake	1:45.14
High jump	Wu Meng-chia; Chinese Taipei	1.75	Fung Wai Yee; Hong Kong	1.73	Svetlana Proshkina; Uzbekistan	1.68
Pole vault	Xu Huiqin; China	3.75	Remi Odajima; Japan	3.55	Jong Un-sim; North Korea	3.00
Long jump	Pennapa Tantragool; Thailand	5.58	Reyma Thomas; Qatar	5.06	Melissa Wu; Singapore	4.94
Triple jump	Kim Jong-gum; North Korea	12.34	Yang Xiuhong; China	12.17	Alexandra Solovyeva; Kazakhstan	11.91
Shot put	Nazanin Golahmadi; Iran	8.77	Fatima Omer; Qatar	8.21	None awarded	
Discus throw	Gu Yu; China	45.43	Subenrat Insaeng; Thailand	42.98	Pak Kum-hyang; North Korea	39.43
Javelin throw	Lee Seon-hye; South Korea	41.10	Stephanie Cimato; Philippines	36.21	None awarded	

== Medal table ==
Rank	Nation	Gold	Silver	Bronze	Total
1	China (CHN)	9	2	1	12
2	Japan (JPN)	4	4	0	8
3	Thailand (THA)	4	3	1	8
4	India (IND)	4	2	2	8
5	South Korea (KOR)	2	2	0	4
6	Chinese Taipei (TPE)	1	2	2	5
7	Iran (IRI)	1	2	1	4
8	Kazakhstan (KAZ)	1	1	3	5
9	North Korea (PRK)	1	1	2	4
10	Yemen (YEM)	1	0	0	1
11	Hong Kong (HKG)	0	2	0	2
11	Qatar (QAT)	0	2	0	2
11	Vietnam (VIE)	0	2	0	2
14	Saudi Arabia (KSA)	0	1	2	3
14	Sri Lanka (SRI)	0	1	2	3
16	Philippines (PHI)	0	1	0	1
17	Singapore (SIN)	0	0	4	4
18	Uzbekistan (UZB)	0	0	2	2
19	Bahrain (BRN)	0	0	1	1
19	Kuwait (KUW)	0	0	1	1
19	Myanmar (MYA)	0	0	1	1
19	Pakistan (PAK)	0	0	1	1
Totals (22 entries)		28	28	26	82

== Results ==
=== Boys ===
==== 100 m ====
===== Round 1 =====
30 June

Rank	Athlete	Time
Heat 1
1	Tsu Ka Chon (HKG)	11.39
2	Vitalii Karnaukhov (KGZ)	11.42
3	Cho Hyun-jun (KOR)	11.43
4	Davron Atabaev (TJK)	11.51
5	Ali Omar Al-Doseri (BRN)	11.68
6	Ali Moosa Shaiba (UAE)	11.74
7	Sandeep Gurung (NEP)	11.89
8	Husam Al-Kindi (OMA)	12.01
Heat 2
1	Masaki Nashimoto (JPN)	10.89
2	Kittisak Phiraksa (THA)	11.19
3	Roman Melnikov (UZB)	11.31
4	Abdullah Al-Asiri (KSA)	11.43
5	Farhan Al-Suwaidi (QAT)	12.14
6	Kinley Tenzin (BHU)	12.63
7	Sükhtömöriin Togoontömör (MGL)	13.19
—	Bambang Wigianto (INA)	DNS
Heat 3
1	Shahrir Anuar (SIN)	11.07
2	Hassan Taftian (IRI)	11.16
3	Hasanain Hussein (IRQ)	11.22
4	Bùi Văn Anh (VIE)	11.26
5	Heshan Amarasinghe (SRI)	11.38
6	Abdullah Boushehri (KUW)	11.75
7	Masbah Ahmmed (BAN)	11.76
8	Hassan Ameer (MDV)	13.34

===== Final =====
3 July

Rank	Athlete	Time
1st place, gold medalist(s)	Masaki Nashimoto (JPN)	10.82
2nd place, silver medalist(s)	Kittisak Phiraksa (THA)	11.11
3rd place, bronze medalist(s)	Shahrir Anuar (SIN)	11.13
4	Bùi Văn Anh (VIE)	11.18
5	Hasanain Hussein (IRQ)	11.24
6	Hassan Taftian (IRI)	11.27
7	Tsu Ka Chon (HKG)	11.30
8	Vitalii Karnaukhov (KGZ)	11.59

==== 400 m ====
===== Round 1 =====
30 June

Rank	Athlete	Time
Heat 1
1	Nitipol Thongpoon (THA)	50.12
2	Dulaj Lahiru (SRI)	51.55
3	Meshal Al-Enezi (KUW)	51.69
4	Yunes Asabeel (BRN)	53.74
5	Htet Zin Min (MYA)	56.15
6	Naiz Hassan (MDV)	1:01.39
Heat 2
1	Fu Pei-yu (TPE)	49.30
2	Abdullah Ahmed Abkar (KSA)	49.63
3	Jared Lim (SIN)	50.39
4	Chan Yan Lam (HKG)	50.46
5	Siddhanta Adhikari (NEP)	51.64
—	Sükhtömöriin Togoontömör (MGL)	DNS
Heat 3
1	Masanori Oishi (JPN)	50.87
2	Nguyễn Hữu Duy (VIE)	51.52
3	Elnor Mukhitdinov (KAZ)	52.16
4	Mohammed Kefah Al-Dosari (QAT)	58.09
—	Abdallah Abunusair (PLE)	DNS

===== Final =====
2 July

Rank	Athlete	Time
1st place, gold medalist(s)	Masanori Oishi (JPN)	48.92
2nd place, silver medalist(s)	Nitipol Thongpoon (THA)	49.27
3rd place, bronze medalist(s)	Abdullah Ahmed Abkar (KSA)	49.29
4	Fu Pei-yu (TPE)	49.61
5	Chan Yan Lam (HKG)	50.11
6	Jared Lim (SIN)	50.88
7	Dulaj Lahiru (SRI)	51.21
8	Nguyễn Hữu Duy (VIE)	52.18

==== 800 m ====
===== Round 1 =====
1 July

Rank	Athlete	Time
Heat 1
1	Indunil Herath (SRI)	1:59.30
2	Ali Jasim (IRQ)	2:00.81
3	Kao Yu-an (TPE)	2:01.06
4	Ruslan Appazov (KAZ)	2:03.33
5	Abdallah Abunusair (PLE)	2:11.78
—	Siddhanta Adhikari (NEP)	DNS
Heat 2
1	Ravi Kumar (IND)	2:03.90
2	Amir Beiranvand (IRI)	2:04.01
3	Ahmed Muayad Mohamed (QAT)	2:04.03
4	Đinh Tiến Nam (VIE)	2:05.15
5	Htet Zin Min (MYA)	2:08.19
6	Adilet Musa Uulu (KGZ)	2:08.25
—	Zachary Ryan Deveraj (SIN)	DNS
Heat 3
1	Park Yong-su (KOR)	2:00.68
2	Rahman Arif (INA)	2:01.47
3	Mohammed Al-Sabahi (YEM)	2:01.54
4	Kutaiba Kana (SYR)	2:02.98
5	Bat-Erdeniin Od-Erdene (MGL)	2:08.25
6	Robert Miguel Nasis (PHI)	2:09.13
7	Pema Khandu (BHU)	2:22.94

===== Final =====
3 July

Rank	Athlete	Time
1st place, gold medalist(s)	Ravi Kumar (IND)	1:55.91
2nd place, silver medalist(s)	Amir Beiranvand (IRI)	1:55.93
3rd place, bronze medalist(s)	Indunil Herath (SRI)	1:56.33
4	Park Yong-su (KOR)	1:58.09
5	Mohammed Al-Sabahi (YEM)	1:59.12
6	Rahman Arif (INA)	1:59.30
7	Kao Yu-an (TPE)	2:01.12
8	Ali Jasim (IRQ)	2:02.05

==== 1500 m ====
30 June

Rank	Athlete	Time
1st place, gold medalist(s)	Waleed Elayah (YEM)	4:00.91
2nd place, silver medalist(s)	Rahul Kumar (IND)	4:05.01
3rd place, bronze medalist(s)	Amir Beiranvand (IRI)	4:05.32
4	Kutaiba Kana (SYR)	4:11.35
5	Hashim Salah Mohamed (QAT)	4:18.76
6	Zachary Ryan Deveraj (SIN)	4:24.48
7	Bat-Erdeniin Od-Erdene (MGL)	4:27.77
8	Adilet Kyshtakbekov (KGZ)	4:35.01
9	Nouraldin Hammouda (PLE)	4:49.76
10	Abdulla Abbas Juma (UAE)	4:50.98

==== 110 m hurdles ====
===== Round 1 =====
1 July

Rank	Athlete	Time
Heat 1
1	Lu Jiateng (CHN)	14.12
2	Wu Han-wei (TPE)	14.69
3	Fahad Al-Azmi (KUW)	14.92
4	Saleh Abdulrahman (UAE)	15.69
5	Malik Al-Nabhani (OMA)	16.17
Heat 2
1	Nader Al-Haydar (KSA)	14.24
2	Mohammad Reza Hassanzadeh (IRI)	14.96
3	Marzouq Abdulrahman (QAT)	16.50
4	Alvin Bandian (PHI)	17.53

===== Final =====
2 July

Rank	Athlete	Time
1st place, gold medalist(s)	Lu Jiateng (CHN)	13.96
2nd place, silver medalist(s)	Nader Al-Haydar (KSA)	14.12
3rd place, bronze medalist(s)	Wu Han-wei (TPE)	14.52
4	Mohammad Reza Hassanzadeh (IRI)	14.93
5	Saleh Abdulrahman (UAE)	15.34
6	Malik Al-Nabhani (OMA)	15.41
7	Marzouq Abdulrahman (QAT)	16.43
—	Fahad Al-Azmi (KUW)	DNF

==== 400 m hurdles ====
2 July

Rank	Athlete	Time
1st place, gold medalist(s)	Chen Dong (CHN)	53.19
2nd place, silver medalist(s)	Selwyn Jebaraj Mervin (IND)	54.41
3rd place, bronze medalist(s)	Yousef Karam (KUW)	54.80
4	Edwin Tay (SIN)	58.00
5	Raine Reyes (PHI)	1:01:53
—	Jassim Mustafa Abdulraouf (UAE)	DSQ
—	Vadim Krivulin (KGZ)	DNS
—	Maher Karim (IRQ)	DNS

==== 4 × 200 m relay ====
===== Round 1 =====
1 July

Rank	Team	Time
Heat 1
1	Thailand (THA)	1:27.46
2	Sri Lanka (SRI)	1:30.80
3	Hong Kong (HKG)	1:31.42
4	Kyrgyzstan (KGZ)	1:35.88
—	Kuwait (KUW)	DNF
—	Indonesia (INA)	DSQ
—	Kazakhstan (KAZ)	DSQ
Heat 2
1	Saudi Arabia (KSA)	1:28.20
2	Bahrain (BRN)	1:33.77
3	United Arab Emirates (UAE)	1:34.17
4	Iraq (IRQ)	1:36.74
5	Qatar (QAT)	1:37.01
—	Iran (IRI)	DSQ
—	Japan (JPN)	DSQ
—	India (IND)	DNS

===== Final =====
3 July

Rank	Team	Time
1st place, gold medalist(s)	Thailand (THA)	1:27.89
2nd place, silver medalist(s)	Sri Lanka (SRI)	1:32.57
3rd place, bronze medalist(s)	Bahrain (BRN)	1:33.80
4	Kyrgyzstan (KGZ)	1:36.16
5	Iraq (IRQ)	1:36.93
—	Hong Kong (HKG)	DSQ
—	Saudi Arabia (KSA)	DSQ
—	United Arab Emirates (UAE)	DSQ

==== High jump ====
3 July

Rank	Athlete	Result
1st place, gold medalist(s)	Ren Wei (CHN)	2.02
2nd place, silver medalist(s)	Kim Yeon-jae (KOR)	2.00
3rd place, bronze medalist(s)	Sergey Oleshko (KAZ)	2.00
4	Hsiang Chun-hsien (TPE)	2.00
5	Milantha Sampath (SRI)	1.97
6	Mostafa Onagh (IRI)	1.94
7	Sapwaturrahman (INA)	1.85
8	Read Kllo (SYR)	1.85
9	Marzouq Abdulrahman (QAT)	1.75
—	Joaquin Ferrer (PHI)	NM

==== Pole vault ====
30 June

Rank	Athlete	Result
1st place, gold medalist(s)	Sho Hibasa (JPN)	4.81
2nd place, silver medalist(s)	Chi Chien-hao (TPE)	4.30
3rd place, bronze medalist(s)	Sean Lim (SIN)	4.30
4	Jo Hyun-pil (KOR)	4.30
5	Nikita Kirillov (KGZ)	4.15
—	Maxim Ryzhkov (KAZ)	NM

==== Long jump ====
2 July

Rank	Athlete	Result
1st place, gold medalist(s)	Huang Haibing (CHN)	7.28
2nd place, silver medalist(s)	Pang Ying Kit (HKG)	6.81
3rd place, bronze medalist(s)	Mohammed Al-Hasan (KSA)	6.68
4	Ashen Fernando (SRI)	6.59
5	Semen Popov (KGZ)	6.47
6	Mohammad Ahmad (KUW)	6.28
7	Kurinawan Noval (INA)	6.25
8	Ruslan Kurbanov (UZB)	6.24
9	Syafiq Poh Shahabiddin (SIN)	6.24
10	Yam Sajan Sunar (NEP)	6.15
11	Lam Chan Weng (MAC)	5.82
12	Ganboldyn Shijirbaatar (MGL)	5.81
13	Abdulrahman Mubarak (QAT)	5.69
14	Khalid Al-Shehhi (UAE)	5.58
15	Hasanain Hussein (IRQ)	5.39

==== Triple jump ====
3 July

Rank	Athlete	Result
1st place, gold medalist(s)	Konstantin Kudryashov (KAZ)	14.80
2nd place, silver medalist(s)	Yan Tun (CHN)	14.59
3rd place, bronze medalist(s)	Ruslan Kurbanov (UZB)	14.59
4	Kim Ji-su (KOR)	14.28
5	Syafiq Poh Shahabiddin (SIN)	13.93
6	Febrianto (INA)	13.20
7	Ali Shaalan (IRQ)	11.84
—	Yam Sajan Sunar (NEP)	NM

==== Shot put ====
3 July

Rank	Athlete	Result
1st place, gold medalist(s)	Li Jun (CHN)	19.45
2nd place, silver medalist(s)	Mehdi Kargarnejad (IRI)	16.76
3rd place, bronze medalist(s)	Panyawut Bumroong (THA)	15.95
4	Ali Ahmad (KUW)	15.20
5	Aleksandr Tsurikov (UZB)	14.90
6	Chan Cheong Tat (MAC)	12.76

==== Discus throw ====
30 June

Rank	Athlete	Result
1st place, gold medalist(s)	Arjun (IND)	58.72
2nd place, silver medalist(s)	Kenta Akiba (JPN)	51.84
3rd place, bronze medalist(s)	Yevgeniy Milovatskiy (KAZ)	51.73
4	Han Won-nam (KOR)	47.01
5	Ali Shirian (IRI)	43.92
—	Aleksandr Tsurikov (UZB)	DNS

==== Javelin throw ====
2 July

Rank	Athlete	Result
1st place, gold medalist(s)	Rohit Kumar (IND)	74.70
2nd place, silver medalist(s)	Cheng Chao-tsun (TPE)	71.97
3rd place, bronze medalist(s)	Raheem Khan (PAK)	60.73
4	Mkarem Al-Mahamid (SYR)	58.47

=== Girls ===
==== 100 m ====
===== Round 1 =====
30 June

Rank	Athlete	Time
Heat 1
1	Akane Kimura (JPN)	12.14
2	Liao Ching-hsien (TPE)	12.42
3	Nurul Imaniar (INA)	12.80
4	Liang Wei (SIN)	12.91
5	Chantsal Purevdorj (THA)	13.54
6	Fatemeh Sassanipoor (QAT)	13.73
7	Dana Ali (BRN)	14.70
8	Danah Haidar (KUW)	15.19
Heat 2
1	Lee Sun-ae (KOR)	12.00
2	He Jiawen (CHN)	12.21
3	Trần Thị Hạng (VIE)	12.75
4	Olga Glukhovkina (UZB)	12.98
5	Nur Afiqah Hj Rozaini (BRU)	13.29
6	Ramita Chaudhary (NEP)	13.68
7	Wajiha Karim (PAK)	14.00
Heat 3
1	Ranjita Mahanta (IND)	12.45
2	Gedsuda Kumklieng (THA)	12.52
3	Zahra Raeisi (IRI)	13.03
4	Akshana Maralanda (SRI)	13.27
5	Shirin Akter (BAN)	13.30
6	Amina Sartbaeva (KGZ)	13.44
7	Chong Ha (MAC)	14.09

===== Final =====
3 July

Rank	Athlete	Time
1st place, gold medalist(s)	Lee Sun-ae (KOR)	12.16
2nd place, silver medalist(s)	Akane Kimura (JPN)	12.36
3rd place, bronze medalist(s)	He Jiawen (CHN)	12.44
4	Ranjita Mahanta (IND)	12.53
5	Liao Ching-hsien (TPE)	12.65
6	Gedsuda Kumklieng (THA)	12.72
7	Trần Thị Hạng (VIE)	12.83
8	Nurul Imaniar (INA)	12.88

==== 400 m ====
===== Round 1 =====
30 June

Rank	Athlete	Time
Heat 1
1	Benjamas Yuadthong (THA)	58.34
2	Elina Mikhina (KAZ)	59.41
3	Nadeeshani Henderson (SRI)	59.63
4	Enkhbaataryn Sarangua (MGL)	1:03.51
5	Bushra Al-Maliki (BRN)	1:09.98
6	Lam Ka Man (MAC)	1:10.12
—	Evgeniia Zakharova (KGZ)	DNS
Heat 2
1	Hsu Yu-wen (TPE)	59.41
2	Manami Date (JPN)	1:00.22
3	Woo Yu-jin (KOR)	1:00.49
4	Ikadiatul (INA)	1:02.08
5	Phạm Thị Thảo (VIE)	1:02.37
6	Clara Poon (SIN)	1:03.80
7	Manisha Adhikari (NEP)	1:05.20
—	Saadah Al-Feras (KUW)	DNF

===== Final =====
2 July

Rank	Athlete	Time
1st place, gold medalist(s)	Benjamas Yuadthong (THA)	57.38
2nd place, silver medalist(s)	Elina Mikhina (KAZ)	57.73
3rd place, bronze medalist(s)	Hsu Yu-wen (TPE)	58.01
4	Nadeeshani Henderson (SRI)	58.08
5	Woo Yu-jin (KOR)	58.27
6	Manami Date (JPN)	59.22
7	Phạm Thị Thảo (VIE)	1:00.52
8	Ikadiatul (INA)	1:00.53

==== 800 m ====
===== Round 1 =====
1 July

Rank	Athlete	Time
Heat 1
1	Namita Kabat (IND)	2:21.51
2	Cà Thị Thận (VIE)	2:21.63
3	Masoumeh Khademi (IRI)	2:29.16
4	Nada Nabil Abdullah (QAT)	2:32.45
—	Lateefah Meftah (KUW)	DNF
Heat 2
1	Myint Swe Li (MYA)	2:25.82
2	Azbilegiin Uyermaa (MGL)	2:27.85
3	Ranjitha Raja (SIN)	2:32.02
4	Vongdala Boudsadee (LAO)	2:39.64
—	Nurainun Perangin Angin (INA)	DSQ

===== Final =====
3 July

Rank	Athlete	Time
1st place, gold medalist(s)	Namita Kabat (IND)	2:15.55
2nd place, silver medalist(s)	Cà Thị Thận (VIE)	2:20.43
3rd place, bronze medalist(s)	Myint Swe Li (MYA)	2:22.14
4	Masoumeh Khademi (IRI)	2:28.27
5	Ranjitha Raja (SIN)	2:29.22
6	Azbilegiin Uyermaa (MGL)	2:30.58
7	Nada Nabil Abdullah (QAT)	2:34.83
—	Vongdala Boudsadee (LAO)	DNS

==== 1500 m ====
30 June

Rank	Athlete	Time
1st place, gold medalist(s)	Li Zhixuan (CHN)	4:34.44
2nd place, silver medalist(s)	Ko Yong-sim (PRK)	4:36.80
3rd place, bronze medalist(s)	Pooja Varhade (IND)	4:39.04
4	Misaki Kuroiwa (JPN)	4:43.29
5	Tatyana Yurchenko (KAZ)	4:53.43
6	Veronika Semenova (UZB)	4:57.41
7	Masoumeh Khademi (IRI)	5:03.76
8	Vũ Thị Hằng (VIE)	5:04.54
9	Ranjitha Raja (SIN)	5:32.72
10	Phwe Phyu (MYA)	5:44.98
—	Azbilegiin Uyermaa (MGL)	DNF
—	Kouth Keomeunekoth (LAO)	DNS

==== 100 m hurdles ====
===== Round 1 =====
1 July

Rank	Athlete	Time
Heat 1
1	Mayu Ueda (JPN)	14.83
2	Daria Kremneva (KGZ)	15.88
3	Inez Leong (SIN)	16.01
4	Keshani Perera (SRI)	16.50
5	Saleha Lahdan (BRN)	18.85
Heat 2
1	Park Seul-gi (KOR)	14.90
2	Irina Asanova (UZB)	15.55
3	Pottakalam Gangadharan (IND)	16.41
4	Nour Al-Sous (SYR)	16.76
5	Mojgan Pakdel (IRI)	16.93
6	Fatemeh Sassanipoor (QAT)	17.46

===== Final =====
2 July

Rank	Athlete	Time
1st place, gold medalist(s)	Mayu Ueda (JPN)	14.18
2nd place, silver medalist(s)	Park Seul-gi (KOR)	14.67
3rd place, bronze medalist(s)	Inez Leong (SIN)	15.22
4	Keshani Perera (SRI)	15.48
5	Irina Asanova (UZB)	15.54
6	Daria Kremneva (KGZ)	15.72
7	Pottakalam Gangadharan (IND)	15.90
8	Nour Al-Sous (SYR)	16.72

==== 400 m hurdles ====
2 July

Rank	Athlete	Time
1st place, gold medalist(s)	Cheng Yafan (CHN)	1:02.15
2nd place, silver medalist(s)	Lê Bình Định (VIE)	1:02.79
3rd place, bronze medalist(s)	Mekala Sushma (IND)	1:03.44
4	Nayomika Gimhani (SRI)	1:03.47
5	Marina Zaiko (KAZ)	1:04:45
6	Inez Leong (SIN)	1:09.62
7	Tatiana Svodina (KGZ)	1:10.33
8	Mahlagha Khanbashi (IRI)	1:14.52

==== 4 × 200 m relay ====
3 July

Rank	Team	Time
1st place, gold medalist(s)	Thailand (THA)	1:41.29
2nd place, silver medalist(s)	Japan (JPN)	1:44.36
3rd place, bronze medalist(s)	Sri Lanka (SRI)	1:45.14
4	Kazakhstan (KAZ)	1:46.60
5	Indonesia (INA)	1:46.68
6	Kyrgyzstan (KGZ)	1:52.33
7	Iran (IRI)	1:53.54

==== High jump ====
30 June

Rank	Athlete	Result
1st place, gold medalist(s)	Wu Meng-chia (TPE)	1.75
2nd place, silver medalist(s)	Fung Wai Yee (HKG)	1.73
3rd place, bronze medalist(s)	Svetlana Proshkina (UZB)	1.68
4	Madushani Siriwardana (SRI)	1.65
5	Anastassiya Loshkaryova (KAZ)	1.60
6	Nguyễn Thị Quỳnh (VIE)	1.60
7	Mahsa Kargar (IRI)	1.55
8	Melissa Wu (SIN)	1.55
9	Nena Achdiyah (INA)	1.55
10	Nour Al-Sous (SYR)	1.55
11	Maryam Al-Ansari (BRN)	1.45
—	Faizah Abdulnaser (QAT)	NM

==== Pole vault ====
1 July

Rank	Athlete	Result
1st place, gold medalist(s)	Xu Huiqin (CHN)	3.75
2nd place, silver medalist(s)	Remi Odajima (JPN)	3.55
3rd place, bronze medalist(s)	Jong Un-sim (PRK)	3.00
—	Liu Yu-yao (TPE)	NM

==== Long jump ====
30 June

Rank	Athlete	Result
1st place, gold medalist(s)	Pennapa Tantragool (THA)	5.58
2nd place, silver medalist(s)	Reyma Thomas (QAT)	5.06
3rd place, bronze medalist(s)	Melissa Wu (SIN)	4.94
4	Farhan Hibah (KUW)	3.89

==== Triple jump ====
1 July

Rank	Athlete	Result
1st place, gold medalist(s)	Kim Jong-gum (PRK)	12.34
2nd place, silver medalist(s)	Yang Xiuhong (CHN)	12.17
3rd place, bronze medalist(s)	Alexandra Solovyena (KAZ)	11.91
4	Tsai Chia-lun (TPE)	11.73
5	Nurshai Shireen Rahim (SIN)	11.08
6	Daria Kuplina (KGZ)	10.73
7	Maryam Al-Ansari (BRN)	10.48
—	Reyma Thomas (QAT)	NM

==== Shot put ====
1 July

Rank	Athlete	Result
1st place, gold medalist(s)	Nazanin Golahmadi (IRI)	8.77
2nd place, silver medalist(s)	Fatima Omer (QAT)	8.21

==== Discus throw ====
2 July

Rank	Athlete	Result
1st place, gold medalist(s)	Gu Yu (CHN)	45.43
2nd place, silver medalist(s)	Subenrat Insaeng (THA)	42.98
3rd place, bronze medalist(s)	Pak Kum-hyang (PRK)	39.43
4	Murugappa Raja Gunasundari (IND)	36.17
5	Nazanin Golahmadi (IRI)	30.49
—	Fatima Omer (QAT)	DNS

==== Javelin throw ====
3 July

Rank	Athlete	Result
1st place, gold medalist(s)	Lee Seon-hye (KOR)	41.10
2nd place, silver medalist(s)	Stephanie Cimato (PHI)	36.21
