= 3x3 basketball at the 2009 Asian Youth Games =

- Venue: Anglican High School
- Dates: 1–4 July 2009

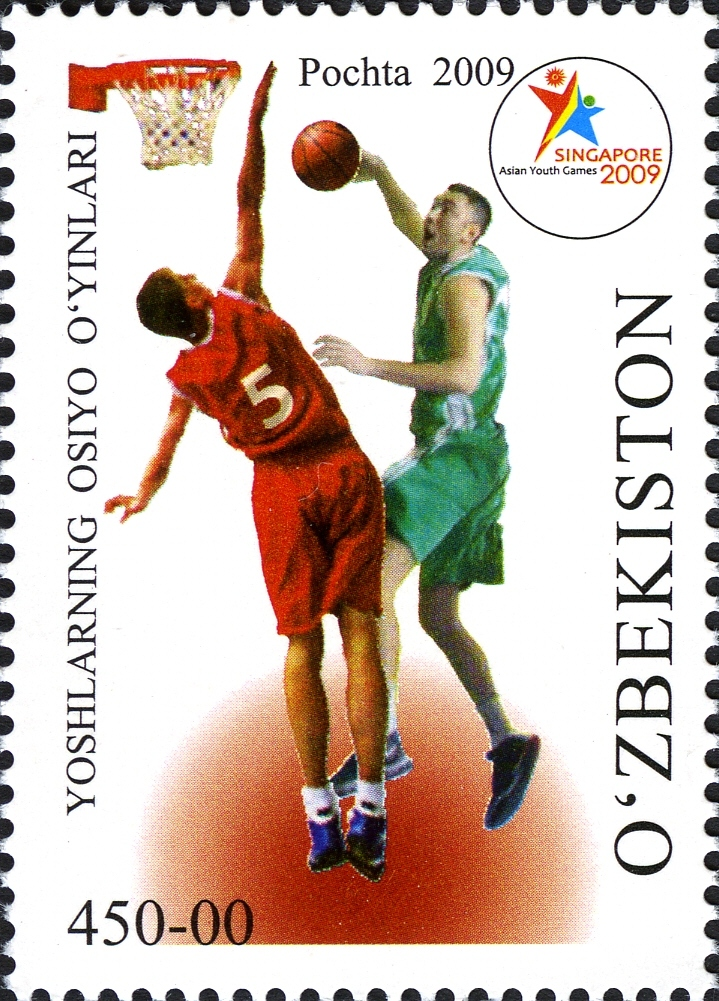
Stamp of Uzbekistan, 2009

3x3 basketball at the 2009 Asian Youth Games was contested by 19 teams in the boys' tournament and 16 teams in the girls' tournament. All games were held at Anglican High School, Singapore. The competition was held using the FIBA 33 ruleset developed by the sport's worldwide governing body, FIBA.

== Medalists ==
Event	Gold	Silver	Bronze
Boys	China; Huang Guobin; Li Weijie; Zhang Minghao; Zhao Xingchen	Iran; Mirmohammad Mirfattahi; Mohammad Ojaghi; Amir Sedighi; Soheil Yousefi	South Korea; Choi Chang-jin; Choi Seong-wook; Lee Dong-yeop; Lee Jong-hyun
Girls	Japan; Naoko Chikahira; Manami Fujioka; Yuki Ikeya; Moeko Nagaoka	China; Jin Jiabao; Ma Xueya; Shen Yi; Song Yang	South Korea; Kang Kye-lee; Park Da-jeong; Jeong Yu-jin; Cha Yea-jin

== Medal table ==
Rank	Nation	Gold	Silver	Bronze	Total
1	China (CHN)	1	1	0	2
2	Japan (JPN)	1	0	0	1
3	Iran (IRI)	0	1	0	1
4	South Korea (KOR)	0	0	2	2
Totals (4 entries)		2	2	2	6

== Results ==
=== Boys ===
==== Preliminary round ====
===== Group A =====
Pos	Team	Pld	W	L	PF	PA	PD	Pts
1	Thailand	3	3	0	85	45	+40	6
2	United Arab Emirates	3	2	1	84	47	+37	5
3	Palestine	3	1	2	75	67	+8	4
4	Bangladesh	3	0	3	14	99	−85	3

Source: Official website

1 July
10:30

Thailand	22–18	United Arab Emirates
Pts: Kongsang 8		Pts: Hassan 10

Anglican High School, Singapore

1 July
15:45

Palestine	23–30	Thailand
Pts: Salaibi 7		Pts: Buranachan 17

Anglican High School, Singapore

2 July
9:00

United Arab Emirates	33–6	Bangladesh
Pts: Al-Wali 16		Pts: Mahmud 6

Anglican High School, Singapore

2 July
15:00

United Arab Emirates	33–19	Palestine
Pts: Hassan 14		Pts: Habash 10

Anglican High School, Singapore

2 July
16:30

Bangladesh	4–33	Thailand
Pts: Obayeda 3		Pts: Rattanapansri 11

Anglican High School, Singapore

3 July
10:30

Palestine	33–4	Bangladesh
Pts: Habash 16		Pts: Mahmud, Obayeda 2

Anglican High School, Singapore

===== Group B =====
Pos	Team	Pld	W	L	PF	PA	PD	Pts
1	South Korea	3	3	0	100	42	+58	6
2	Sri Lanka	3	2	1	83	48	+35	5
3	Qatar	3	1	2	47	90	−43	4
4	Nepal	3	0	3	45	95	−50	3

Source: Official website

1 July
9:00

Sri Lanka	33–11	Nepal
Pts: Keyser 14		Pts: Lama 5

Anglican High School, Singapore

1 July
15:00

Qatar	4–34	Sri Lanka
Pts: Basulaiman 4		Pts: Stallone 17

Anglican High School, Singapore

2 July
9:00

South Korea	33–15	Qatar
Pts: Lee J. 18		Pts: Al-Jaber 8

Anglican High School, Singapore

2 July
14:15

South Korea	34–11	Nepal
Pts: Lee D. 14		Pts: Tamrakar 4

Anglican High School, Singapore

3 July
9:00

Sri Lanka	16–33	South Korea
Pts: Udumalagala 12		Pts: Choi C. 16

Anglican High School, Singapore

3 July
10:30

Nepal	23–28	Qatar
Pts: Maharjan 12		Pts: Basulaiman 11

Anglican High School, Singapore

===== Group C =====
Pos	Team	Pld	W	L	PF	PA	PD	Pts
1	Philippines	4	4	0	130	94	+36	8
2	Iran	4	3	1	121	67	+54	7
3	Japan	4	2	2	106	85	+21	6
4	Jordan	4	1	3	92	106	−14	5
5	Mongolia	4	0	4	37	134	−97	4

Source: Official website

1 July
9:45

Philippines	27–26	Iran
Pts: Javillonar 13		Pts: Sedighi 12

Anglican High School, Singapore

1 July
11:15

Japan	33–8	Jordan
Pts: Aratani 14		Pts: Al-Jararah 4

Anglican High School, Singapore

1 July
15:45

Mongolia	11–34	Philippines
Pts: Tsenguun 10		Pts: Teng 17

Anglican High School, Singapore

1 July
16:30

Iran	33–14	Japan
Pts: Yousefi 18		Pts: Hashimoto 8

Anglican High School, Singapore

2 July
9:45

Jordan	33–10	Mongolia
Pts: Al-Jararah 13		Pts: Tsenguun 8

Anglican High School, Singapore

2 July
11:15

Japan	26–34	Philippines
Pts: Hashimoto 12		Pts: Tolomia 12

Anglican High School, Singapore

2 July
15:45

Jordan	20–28	Iran
Pts: Al-Jararah, Al-Naser 6		Pts: Sedighi 15

Anglican High School, Singapore

2 July
16:30

Mongolia	10–33	Japan
Pts: Tsenguun 7		Pts: Hashimoto 18

Anglican High School, Singapore

3 July
9:45

Philippines	35–31	Jordan
Pts: Javillonar 17		Pts: Al-Taweel 15

Anglican High School, Singapore

3 July
11:15

Iran	34–6	Mongolia
Pts: Sedighi 25		Pts: Tamir 5

Anglican High School, Singapore

===== Group D =====
Pos	Team	Pld	W	L	PF	PA	PD	Pts
1	China	3	3	0	100	50	+50	6
2	Singapore	3	2	1	89	67	+22	5
3	India	3	1	2	76	75	+1	4
4	Uzbekistan	3	0	3	27	100	−73	3

Source: Official website

1 July
9:45

Singapore	21–34	China
Pts: Low 9		Pts: Li 15

Anglican High School, Singapore

1 July
11:15

Uzbekistan	8–33	India
Pts: Khabibulin 5		Pts: Goswami 20

Anglican High School, Singapore

1 July
17:15

China	33–10	Uzbekistan
Pts: Zhang 16		Pts: Khabibulin 7

Anglican High School, Singapore

2 July
10:30

Uzbekistan	9–34	Singapore
Pts: Kotolomeev 4		Pts: Su 14

Anglican High School, Singapore

2 July
15:00

India	19–33	China
Pts: Goswami 11		Pts: Li 13

Anglican High School, Singapore

3 July
9:45

Singapore	34–24	India
Pts: Low 18		Pts: Goswami 12

Anglican High School, Singapore

==== Knockout round ====
Quarterfinals
3 July
Thailand	19
Iran	33
3 July
South Korea	34
Singapore	24
3 July
Philippines	33
United Arab Emirates	9
3 July
China	34
Sri Lanka	9

Semifinals
4 July
Iran	33
South Korea	28
4 July
Philippines	31
China	34

Final
4 July
Iran	26
China	29
3rd & 4th place
4 July
South Korea	33
Philippines	29

===== Quarterfinals =====
3 July
15:00

Thailand	19–33	Iran
Pts: Buranachan, Kongsang, Mattayamanan 4		Pts: Sedighi 20

Anglican High School, Singapore

3 July
15:00

South Korea	34–24	Singapore
Pts: Lee J. 13		Pts: Low 12

Anglican High School, Singapore

3 July
15:45

Philippines	33–9	United Arab Emirates
Pts: Tolomia 14		Pts: Hassan 5

Anglican High School, Singapore

3 July
15:45

China	34–9	Sri Lanka
Pts: Li 20		Pts: Udumalagala 4

Anglican High School, Singapore

===== Semifinals =====
4 July
9:45

Iran	33–28	South Korea
Pts: Sedighi 16		Pts: Lee J. 11

Anglican High School, Singapore

4 July
9:45

Philippines	31–34	China
Pts: Teng 14		Pts: Li 17

Anglican High School, Singapore

===== 3rd & 4th place =====
4 July
12:45

South Korea	33–29	Philippines
Pts: Lee D. 13		Pts: Bonleon 13

Anglican High School, Singapore

===== Final =====
4 July
14:30

Iran	26–29	China
Pts: Yousefi, Mirfattahi 9		Pts: Li 17

Anglican High School, Singapore

=== Girls ===
==== Preliminary round ====
===== Group A =====
Pos	Team	Pld	W	L	PF	PA	PD	Pts
1	Thailand	2	2	0	68	39	+29	4
2	Indonesia	2	1	1	54	59	−5	3
3	Jordan	2	0	2	43	67	−24	2

Source: Official website

1 July
13:30

Thailand	34–21	Indonesia
Pts: Maihom 12		Pts: Christaline 11

Anglican High School, Singapore

2 July
12:00

Jordan	18–34	Thailand
Pts: Oweiss 17		Pts: Maihom 12

Anglican High School, Singapore

3 July
12:45

Indonesia	33–25	Jordan
Pts: Sutopo 14		Pts: Oweiss 10

Anglican High School, Singapore

===== Group B =====
Pos	Team	Pld	W	L	PF	PA	PD	Pts
1	Japan	3	3	0	100	19	+81	6
2	South Korea	3	2	1	86	51	+35	5
3	Nepal	3	1	2	46	95	−49	4
4	Kuwait	3	0	3	31	98	−67	3

Source: Official website

1 July
12:00

South Korea	34–14	Nepal
Pts: Park 11		Pts: Shah 6

Anglican High School, Singapore

1 July
13:30

Japan	33–0	Kuwait
Pts: Chikahira 16		Pts: 0

Anglican High School, Singapore

2 July
11:15

Nepal	0–34	Japan
Pts: 0		Pts: Chikahira 14

Anglican High School, Singapore

2 July
12:45

South Korea	33–4	Kuwait
Pts: Jeong 17		Pts: Al-Mutawa 3

Anglican High School, Singapore

3 July
12:00

Japan	33–19	South Korea
Pts: Chikahira 18		Pts: Park 9

Anglican High School, Singapore

3 July
13:30

Kuwait	27–32	Nepal
Pts: Abu Marzouq 12		Pts: Bista 10

Anglican High School, Singapore

===== Group C =====
Pos	Team	Pld	W	L	PF	PA	PD	Pts
1	China	3	3	0	100	30	+70	6
2	India	3	2	1	86	61	+25	5
3	Singapore	3	1	2	65	64	+1	4
4	Bahrain	3	0	3	4	100	−96	3

Source: Official website

1 July
12:45

China	33–7	Singapore
Pts: Jin, Ma 15		Pts: Tok 7

Anglican High School, Singapore

2 July
12:45

Singapore	25–29	India
Pts: Ng 13		Pts: Loganathan 17

Anglican High School, Singapore

2 July
14:15

China	33–0	Bahrain
Pts: Ma 14		Pts: 0

Anglican High School, Singapore

2 July
17:15

India	34–2	Bahrain
Pts: Priyadharshini 15		Pts: Mohamed 6

Anglican High School, Singapore

3 July
12:00

India	23–34	China
Pts: Bhuskute 13		Pts: Ma 20

Anglican High School, Singapore

3 July
13:30

Bahrain	2–33	Singapore
Pts: Ebrahim 2		Pts: Tok 13

Anglican High School, Singapore

===== Group D =====
Pos	Team	Pld	W	L	PF	PA	PD	Pts
1	Philippines	2	2	0	30	22	+8	4
2	Sri Lanka	2	1	1	56	57	−1	3
3	Uzbekistan	2	0	2	29	36	−7	2

Source: Official website

1 July
14:15

Sri Lanka	34–29	Uzbekistan
Pts: Thewahettige 16		Pts: Turgunova 15

Anglican High School, Singapore

2 July
13:30

Philippines	2–0	Uzbekistan
Pts: Melendres 13		Pts: Komarova 17

Anglican High School, Singapore

3 July
12:45

Sri Lanka	22–28	Philippines
Pts: Thewahettige 17		Pts: Araneta, Jose 11

Anglican High School, Singapore

- Uzbekistan lost the match by default against Philippines as all but 1 of its players were fouled out. As Uzbekistan were ahead 28–26 when the game was called off.

==== Knockout round ====
Quarterfinals
3 July
Thailand	34
India	19
3 July
Japan	33
Sri Lanka	2
3 July
China	34
Indonesia	13
3 July
Philippines	21
South Korea	32

Semifinals
4 July
Thailand	13
Japan	33
4 July
China	33
South Korea	23

Final
4 July
Japan	33
China	32
3rd & 4th place
4 July
Thailand	30
South Korea	34

===== Quarterfinals =====
3 July
16:30

Thailand	34–19	India
Pts: Maihom 14		Pts: Priyadharshini 14

Anglican High School, Singapore

3 July
16:30

Japan	33–2	Sri Lanka
Pts: Chikahira 11		Pts: Dhanushika 2

Anglican High School, Singapore

3 July
17:15

China	34–13	Indonesia
Pts: Ma 18		Pts: Christaline 11

Anglican High School, Singapore

3 July
17:15

Philippines	21–32	South Korea
Pts: Jose 11		Pts: Jeong 16

Anglican High School, Singapore

===== Semifinals =====
4 July
9:00

Thailand	13–33	Japan
Pts: Maihom 7		Pts: Chikahira 12

Anglican High School, Singapore

4 July
9:00

China	33–23	South Korea
Pts: Shen 17		Pts: Jeong 8

Anglican High School, Singapore

===== 3rd & 4th place =====
4 July
12:00

Thailand	30–34	South Korea
Pts: Maihom 17		Pts: Jeong 20

Anglican High School, Singapore

===== Final =====
4 July
13:30

Japan	33–32	China
Pts: Nagaoka 23		Pts: Ma 11

Anglican High School, Singapore
