= Masaki Nashimoto =

Japanese sprinter (born 1993)

Personal information
- Nationality: Japan
- Born: 12 December 1993 (age 32) Chiba Prefecture, Japan
- Education: Daito Bunka University
- Height: 1.65 m (5 ft 5 in)
- Weight: 63 kg (139 lb)

Sport
- Sport: Running
- Event: 100 m
- Club: NTN Track ＆ Field Club

Achievements and titles
- Personal best: 10.38s (Chiba 2011)
Medal record
Men's athletics
Representing Japan
Summer Youth Olympics
Silver medal – second place	2010 Singapore	100 m
Asian Youth Games
Gold medal – first place	2009 Singapore	100 m

Masaki Nashimoto (梨本 真輝, Nashimoto Masaki; born December 12, 1993) is a Japanese sprinter.

Nashimoto competed in the 100 metre sprint at the 2009 Asian Youth Games and 2010 Summer Youth Olympics, both held in Singapore, winning gold and silver respectively. In the latter, Nashimoto lost out to Odean Skeen but beat favourite David Bolarinwa to silver in a photo finish.

His personal best in the 100 metres is 10.38 seconds set in 2011.

== International competition ==
Year	Competition	Venue	Position	Event	Time	Notes
Representing Japan and Asia (Youth Olympics medley relay only)
2009	Asian Youth Games	Singapore	1st	100 m	10.82 (wind: -1.2 m/s)	
2009	Asian Youth Games	Singapore	— (h)	4×200 m relay	DQ (relay leg: 1st)	
2010	Asian Youth Olympic Trials	Singapore	3rd	100 m	10.85 (wind: -1.6 m/s)	
2010	Summer Youth Olympics	Singapore	2nd	100 m	10.51 (wind: +0.1 m/s)	PB
2010	Summer Youth Olympics	Singapore	5th	Medley relay	1:54.14 (relay leg: 1st)	
2012	Asian Junior Championships	Colombo, Sri Lanka	8th	100 m	12.69 (wind: -2.3 m/s)	
