= Iran at the 2009 Asian Youth Games =

- IOC code: IRI
- NOC: National Olympic Committee of the Islamic Republic of Iran

in Singapore
- Competitors: 54 in 6 sports
- Flag bearer: Noushin Shahbazifard
- Medals Ranked 11th: Gold 1 Silver 3 Bronze 2 Total 6

Asian Youth Games appearances
- 2009; 2013; 2025

Iran participated in the 2009 Asian Youth Games held in Singapore from June 29, 2009 to July 7, 2009. This country is ranked 11th with one gold medal in this edition of the Youth Asiad.

== Competitors ==
Sport	Boys	Girls	Total
3x3 basketball	4		4
Athletics	6	6	12
Diving	2		2
Football	18		18
Shooting	4	4	8
Swimming	6		6
Table tennis	2	2	4
Total	42	12	54

== Medal summary ==
=== Medals by sport ===
Sport	Gold	Silver	Bronze	Total
3x3 basketball		1		1
Athletics	1	2	1	4
Football			1	1
Total	1	3	2	6

=== Medalists ===
Medal	Name	Sport	Event
Gold	Nazanin Golahmadi	Athletics	Girls' shot put
Silver	Mirmohammad Mirfattahi; Mohammad Ojaghi; Amir Sedighi; Soheil Yousefi	3x3 basketball	Boys
Silver	Amir Beiranvand	Athletics	Boys' 800 m
Silver	Mehdi Kargarnejad	Athletics	Boys' shot put
Bronze	Amir Beiranvand	Athletics	Boys' 1500 m
Bronze	Meisam Labbaf; Arash Esmaeili; Armin Sohrabian; Omid Tavakkoli; Fereydoun Zobeidani; Mohammad Mamashli; Bahman Jahantigh; Milad Sarlak; Reza Mirahmadi; Siavash Haghnazari; Mohammad Ghanbari; Alireza Bohlouli; Amir Reza Ghamnak; Saeid Aghaei; Mehdi Kor; Mehdi Pourdadashvand; Mohsen Gheibi; Mohammad Reza Alikhani	Football	Boys

== Results by event ==
=== 3x3 basketball ===
Athlete	Event	Preliminary round					Quarterfinal	Semifinal	Final	Rank
Athlete	Event	Round 1	Round 2	Round 3	Round 4	Rank	Quarterfinal	Semifinal	Final	Rank
Mirmohammad Mirfattahi; Mohammad Ojaghi; Amir Sedighi; Soheil Yousefi	Boys	Philippines; L 26–27	Japan; W 33–14	Jordan; W 28–20	Mongolia; W 34–6	2 Q	Thailand; W 33–19	South Korea; W 33–28	China; L 26–29	2nd place, silver medalist(s)

=== Aquatics ===
==== Diving ====
Athlete	Event	Preliminary		Final	
Athlete	Event	Score	Rank	Score	Rank
Hamid Karimi	Boys' 3 m springboard	391.30	6 Q	372.40	6
Ali Shakoul	Boys' platform	402.30	4 Q	380.75	4

==== Swimming ====
Athlete	Event	Heats		Semifinals		Final	
Athlete	Event	Time	Rank	Time	Rank	Time	Rank
Pouya Jadidi	Boys' 50 m freestyle	24.75	6 Q	24.68	8 Q	24.93	7
Ahmad Reza Jalali	Boys' 50 m freestyle	24.46	4 Q	24.27	6 Q	24.46	5
Pouya Jadidi	Boys' 100 m freestyle	54.84	12 Q	55.18	14	Did not advance	
Pouria Maldar Ghasri	Boys' 50 m backstroke	30.11	11	—N/a		Did not advance	
Pouria Maldar Ghasri	Boys' 100 m backstroke	1:02.32	13 Q	1:02.24	13	Did not advance	
Pouria Maldar Ghasri	Boys' 200 m backstroke	2:17.87	11	—N/a		Did not advance	
Sepehr Afjehei	Boys' 50 m breaststroke	31.83	10 Q	31.76	10	Did not advance	
Sepehr Afjehei	Boys' 100 m breaststroke	1:10.46	15 Q	1:10.25	13	Did not advance	
Arvin Moradi	Boys' 50 m butterfly	26.14	5 Q	—N/a		26.24	5
Arvin Moradi	Boys' 100 m butterfly	59.68	18	Did not advance			
Ahmad Reza Jalali	Boys' 200 m individual medley	2:15.68	9	—N/a		Did not advance	
Pouya Jadidi; Arvin Moradi; Pouria Maldar Ghasri; Ahmad Reza Jalali	Boys' 4 × 100 m freestyle relay	3:40.31	8 Q	—N/a		3:38.32	7
Pouria Maldar Ghasri; Sepehr Afjehei; Homayoun Haghighi; Arvin Moradi	Boys' 4 × 100 m medley relay	4:10.66	12	—N/a		Did not advance	

=== Athletics ===
Athlete	Event	Round 1		Final	Rank
Athlete	Event	Time	Rank	Time / Result	Rank
Hassan Taftian	Boys' 100 m	11.16	2 Q	11.27	6
Amir Beiranvand	Boys' 800 m	2:04.01	2 Q	1:55.93	2nd place, silver medalist(s)
Amir Beiranvand	Boys' 1500 m	—N/a		4:05.32	3rd place, bronze medalist(s)
Mohammad Reza Hassanzadeh	Boys' 110 m hurdles	14.96	2 Q	14.93	4
Amir Beiranvand; Mohammad Reza Hassanzadeh; Mostafa Onagh; Hassan Taftian	Boys' 4 × 200 m relay	DSQ	—	Did not advance	—
Mostafa Onagh	Boys' high jump	—N/a		1.94 m	6
Mehdi Kargarnejad	Boys' shot put	—N/a		16.76 m	2nd place, silver medalist(s)
Ali Shirian	Boys' discus throw	—N/a		43.92 m	5
Zahra Raeisi	Girls' 100 m	13.03	3	Did not advance	11
Masoumeh Khademi	Girls' 800 m	2:29.16	3 Q	2:28.27	4
Masoumeh Khademi	Girls' 1500 m	—N/a		5:03.76	7
Mojgan Pakdel	Girls' 100 m hurdles	16.93	5	Did not advance	9
Mahlagha Khanbashi	Girls' 400 m hurdles	—N/a		1:14.52	8
Masoumeh Khademi; Mahlagha Khanbashi; Mojgan Pakdel; Zahra Raeisi	Girls' 4 × 200 m relay	—N/a		1:53.54	7
Mahsa Kargar	Girls' high jump	—N/a		1.55 m	7
Nazanin Golahmadi	Girls' shot put	—N/a		8.77 m	1st place, gold medalist(s)
Nazanin Golahmadi	Girls' discus throw	—N/a		30.49 m	5

=== Football ===
Team	Event	Preliminary round		Second round				Semifinal	Final	Rank
Team	Event	Round 1	Rank	Round 1	Round 2	Round 3	Rank	Semifinal	Final	Rank
Iran	Boys	Chinese Taipei; W 6–0	1 Q	Singapore; W 2–1	China; W 4–2	Thailand; W 4–0	1 Q	North Korea; L 0–1	3rd place match China; W 2–0	3rd place, bronze medalist(s)
Roster: Meisam Labbaf; Arash Esmaeili; Armin Sohrabian; Omid Tavakkoli; Fereydoun Zobeidani; Mohammad Mamashli; Bahman Jahantigh; Milad Sarlak; Reza Mirahmadi; Siavash Haghnazari; Mohammad Ghanbari; Alireza Bohlouli; Amir Reza Ghamnak; Saeid Aghaei; Mehdi Kor; Mehdi Pourdadashvand; Mohsen Gheibi; Mohammad Reza Alikhani; Coach: Mohammad Yavari

=== Shooting ===
Athlete	Event	Qualification		Final		
Athlete	Event	Score	Rank	Score	Total	Rank
Sepehr Saffari	Boys' 10 m air pistol	559, 51.1 SO	7 Q	97.6	656.6	8
Ali Tammari	Boys' 10 m air pistol	508	31	Did not advance		
Majid Najafi	Boys' 10 m air rifle	551	27	Did not advance		
Pouria Norouzian	Boys' 10 m air rifle	559	23	Did not advance		
Mina Barani	Girls' 10 m air pistol	367	12	Did not advance		
Yasaman Heidari	Girls' 10 m air pistol	357	20	Did not advance		
Maedeh Aminzadeh	Girls' 10 m air rifle	382	24	Did not advance		
Noushin Shahbazifard	Girls' 10 m air rifle	384	19	Did not advance		

=== Table tennis ===
Athlete	Event	Round of 64	Round of 32	Round of 16	Quarterfinal	Semifinal	Final	Rank
Alireza Mollarajabi	Boys' singles	Holikov (UZB); W 3–0 (3, 7, 4)	Machi (JPN); W 3–1 (7, −6, 8, 7)	Tay (SIN); W 3–0 (8, 7, 8)	Kim (KOR); L 1–4 (−6, −10, 7, −8, −4)	Did not advance		5
Mohammad Ali Roueintan	Boys' singles	Bye	Pitakgulsiri (THA); L 2–3 (−6, 7, −6, 8, −9)	Did not advance				17
Fatemeh Hosseinzadeh	Girls' singles	Bye	Sangpao (THA); L 0–3 (−7, −7, −10)	Did not advance				17
Soulmaz Mohammadpour	Girls' singles	Bye	Ali (PAK); W 3–0 (6, 7, 8)	Li (SIN); L 0–3 (−4, −4, −4)	Did not advance			9
