= Temasek Junior College =

College in Singapore founded 1976

Coordinates: 1.319467°N 103.935438°E

- 淡马锡初级学院; Maktab Rendah Temasek தெமாசெக் தொடக்கக் கல்லூரி

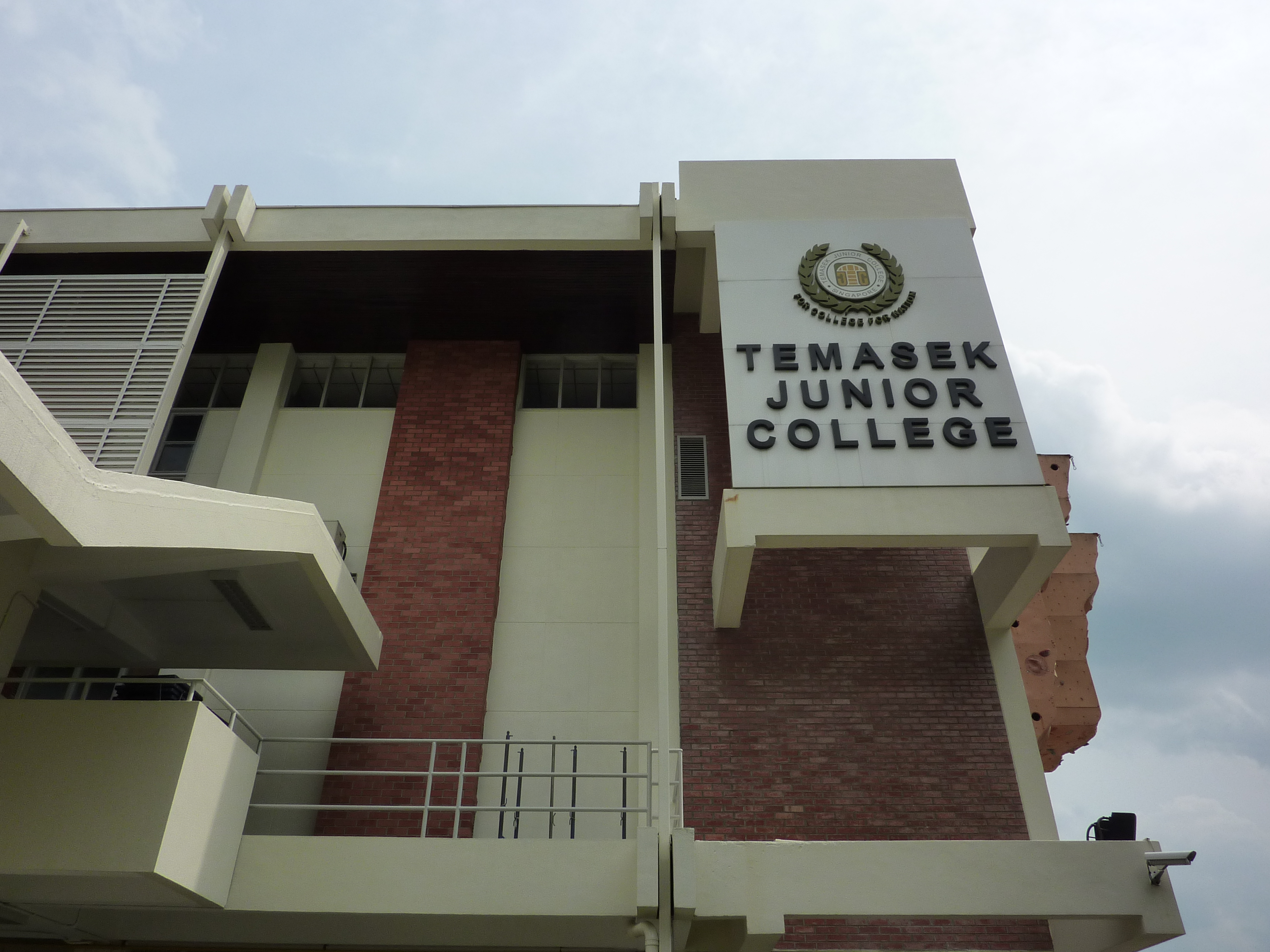
- A photo of the school's front
- 2 Tampines Avenue 9 Singapore 529564 (Formerly located at 22 Bedok South Road; Singapore 469278)

Information
- Type: Government
- Motto: For College, For Nation
- Established: 1976; 50 years ago
- Session: Single Session
- School code: 0702
- Principal: Liu Earnler
- Enrolment: IP Programme: approx. 700; JC: approx. 900
- Colour: Green
- Website: temasekjc.moe.edu.sg

Temasek Junior College (TJC) is a government-run junior college temporarily located in Tampines. Its original location in Bedok South is currently undergoing reconstruction as part of the JC Rejuvenation Programme. It offers a six-year Integrated Programme alongside a two-year Singapore-Cambridge GCE Advanced Level curriculum.

== History ==
Temasek Junior College was established in 1976 as the second government junior college in Singapore, and it took in its pioneer batch of students in 1977. The name "Temasek" is a reference to Singapore's ancient name, which can be understood as "sea town". It was adopted by the college to "honour the resilience, fortitude and courage of Singapore's forefathers."

In 1982, Temasek Junior College became one of the pre-university centres to offer its variation of the Humanities Scholarship Programme (HSP), co-ordinated by the Ministry of Education. In 2005, Temasek Junior College started a four-year Integrated Programme known as Temasek Academy. In 2013, the Integrated Programme was expanded to be a six-year course, taking students in after PSLE.

Temasek Junior College's 47-year-old campus in Bedok South will be rebuilt. Construction of the new campus was initially planned to start at the beginning of 2022, while the college would temporarily move to the former site of Tampines Junior College that same year. However, due to Covid-19, this was postponed twice, first to 2023 and finally 2024. The construction would take four years to complete, with the new campus at the original Bedok South site becoming operational in 2028.

During the reconstruction, Temasek JC students will attend school as per normal at the Tampines Junior College holding site.

=== Integrated Programme ===
In 2005, the 4-year Temasek Academy began with an intake of 121 students. Singaporean and international students were admitted at secondary three (typically at the age of 15). They would bypass the GCE 'O' Level examinations which most students take at the age of 16, except higher mother tongue which they are still required to take. They would sit for the GCE 'A' Level examinations at the end of the fourth year.

In 2013, the four-year Temasek Academy programme was revamped as a six-year Temasek Junior College Integrated Programme, which admits students through the Secondary School Joint Admission Exercise at the secondary one level.

=== Accreditation as a Centre of Excellence for Research ===
Temasek Junior College was affirmed as the East Zone Centre of Excellence for Educational Research by the Ministry of Education in 2008, offering a niche in curriculum research and development in specialised research centres in the College. The facilities in the research centre include computers with research and video editing software, an observation room installed with 2-way mirror and recording equipment, as well as rooms for collaborative research work.

In 2014, Temasek Junior College became an affiliated organisation of the Action Learning, Action Research Association Inc. (ALARA), providing support to its research centre for teachers to share their research projects through the association's journal and through international conferences.

Temasek Junior College was accorded the School Distinction Award in 2015.

== Culture and identity ==
=== Crest ===
The crest of Temasek Junior College depicts the letters TJC in bold form, with the letter T resembling the silhouette of its Lecture Theatres, reflecting an iconic architectural feature of the College.

- The green background acknowledges the school's alignment with the national objective of maintaining a clean and green country.
- The divisions in the cross of the T stand for the five national ideals of justice, equality, happiness, prosperity and progress.
- The segments in the trunk of the T symbolise the four major areas working in unison within the College towards the national ideals.

=== Houses ===
The houses are named according to the Greek alphabet and have an association and colour tagged to them. These are the Alpha Warriors (Blue), the Beta Knights (Red/White), the Gamma Gods (Yellow) and the Delta Dragons (Green).

== Academic information ==
Temasek Junior College offers both the six-year Integrated Programme and a two-year pre-university programme, both leading up to the Singapore-Cambridge GCE Advanced Level examination. In 2021, 98% of Temasek Junior College graduates were eligible for university admission, with passes in at least three H2 subjects and a pass in General Paper or Knowledge and Inquiry in a single examination sitting.

=== Integrated Programme ===
Since 2013, Temasek Junior College offers a six-year integrated programme to all students participating in the Secondary School Joint Admissions Exercise. Previously called the Temasek Academy initiated in 2005, the integrated programme leads to the Singapore-Cambridge GCE Advanced Level examination, bypassing the Singapore-Cambridge GCE Ordinary Level Examination. TJC continues to accept students who sat for the GCE 'O' Level examination through the Joint Admissions Exercise (JAE).

=== Temasek Humanities Programme ===
Temasek Junior College is a junior college that runs the Humanities Scholarship Programme offered by the Ministry of Education (MOE). The programme offers students opportunities to participate in humanities-related learning experiences.

=== Music Elective Programme (MEP) ===
Temasek Junior College offers the MOE Music Elective Programme, which offers opportunities for students in composing, performing, and analysing music.

=== Chinese Language Elective Programme (CLEP) ===
Temasek Junior College is one of the five pre-university centres to offer the Chinese Language Elective Programme (CLEP, or 语特), since the launch of the programme in 1990. Students are required to undertake H2 Chinese Language and Literature and a Chinese Language related subject to be eligible for the programme. As with other institutions offering the C-LEP, successful applicants to the programme are eligible two bonus points in their admission to Temasek Junior College.

== Notable alumni ==
=== Government and politics ===
- Fatimah Lateef, former Member of Parliament
- Lee Hui Ying, Member of Parliament for Nee Soon GRC
- Lim Biow Chuan, former Deputy Speaker and former Member of Parliament
- Low Yen Ling, Senior Minister of State and Member of Parliament for Bukit Gombak SMC
- Poh Li San, Member of Parliament for Sembawang West SMC
- Sharael Taha, Member of Parliament for Pasir Ris-Changi GRC
- Inderjit Singh, former Member of Parliament
- Patrick Tay Teck Guan, Member of Parliament for Pioneer SMC
- Zainal Bin Sapari, former Member of Parliament
- Yee Jenn Jong, former Non-constituency Member of Parliament
- Shahira Abdullah, former Non-constituency Member of Parliament

=== Education and the arts ===
- Ivan Heng, Singaporean stage actor and director
- Nelson Kwei, prominent music conductor
- Roy Li, singer-songwriter
- Michelle Saram, entrepreneur; Singaporean actress
- Haresh Sharma, playwright, The Necessary Stage
- Evelyn Tan, actress
- Cyril Wong, Singaporean poet
- Youyi, presenter and actress
- Haslinda Amin, journalist, Bloomberg Television

== See also ==
- Education in Singapore
