= Nelson Kwei =

Singaporean choral conductor (born 1961)

- Born: 24 September 1961 (age 64)
- Occupations: Choral conductor, music arranger

Nelson Kwei (Chinese: 桂乃舜; pinyin: Guì Nǎi Shùn; born 24 September 1961) is a Singaporean choral conductor. He is currently conductor of Victoria Junior College choir, Victoria Chorale, the National University of Singapore Choir, and is previously choral director to the choirs of Tanjong Katong Secondary School, Catholic High School, and Victoria School. Kwei founded local choral ensemble The Vocal Consort. An alumnus of Anglican High School and Temasek Junior College, he studied mathematics at the National University of Singapore and choral conducting at the Royal Academy of Music, London.

== Biography ==
Nelson Kwei was born the youngest child out of a family of four brothers. His surname is that of his mother's; his father's surname is 'Chen'. He attended Chong Hock Primary School and Anglican High School, as well as Temasek Junior College. He majored in mathematics in the National University of Singapore and minored in computer science. He received a master's degree in choral conducting at the Royal Academy of Music, London.

=== Career ===
In 2013, Nelson was specially elected to receive the Associateship from the Royal Academy of Music for his outstanding achievements in choral music. He currently holds the record in Singapore of garnering an unprecedented 185 gold or distinction awards and 79 champion titles for Singapore.

A familiar figure in the local choral scene, Nelson started conducting at the age of 10 when he was selected to direct his school harmonica band, symphonic band and choir. It was the start of an illustrious career. As a student, he went on to conduct and sing for the Anglican High School Choir, the Temasek Junior College Choir and the National University of Singapore Choir. Upon graduation in 1985, he founded and conducted the Victoria Junior College Choir and Varsity Choral Ensemble.

In June 1990, the VJC Choir made history in the local music scene by being the first school choir to win an international choir competition at the Welsh Eisteddfod. Nelson's conducting style and interpretation of music were highly commended by the distinguished panel of judges. Since then, He has led the Victoria Chorale, the Tampines Junior College Choir, The Amadeus Choral Society, the Victoria School Choir, the Catholic High School Choir and the Dunman High School Choir to clinch top prizes at international choral competitions such as Bournemouth Musicmakers International Competition Festival, Riva Del Garda Concorso Corale Internazionale, Llangollen International Musical Eisteddfod, International Choral Competition at Pohlhelm, Germany, Mendelssohn Bartholdy International Choral Competition, Germany, Choir Olympic 2000, Austria, Hawaii International Choir Competition Festival and Pacific Basin Music Festival.

Nelson was also the first choral scholar from Singapore. He was awarded the prestigious scholarship in 1990 by the Ministry of Education resulting in a Certificate of Advanced Studies in Choral Conducting Studies for the Post-Graduate from the Royal Academy of Music in London. Upon his return, he was appointed as a Choral Project Officer with the ECA Centre, Ministry of Education. During his service with the Ministry of Education, Nelson had conducted many choral workshops for choir teachers and took charge of many national projects.

In 2012, Nelson was once again presented with his 6th conducting prize in the 28th Franz-Schubert Choir Competition held in Vienna, Austria where he led Victoria Junior College Choir to attain 4 Gold awards and 2 Category Champion prizes. In 2013, he led the National University of Singapore Choir to achieve an unprecedented result of three 1st Prizes in the oldest choral competition in the world, the Llangollen International Musical Eisteddfod held in Wales, UK. Recently in 2015, he led the Victoria Junior College Choir to 4 Category Champion awards in Hoi An, Vietnam, cementing our nation's status in the international choral arena.

== Awards ==
- 1993 : National Youth Service Award (Singapore)
- 1998: Outstanding Choral Director Award (International Choral Competition)
- 1999: Outstanding Choral Director Award (International Choral Competition)
- 1999: Culture Award (Japanese Chamber of Commerce and Industry, Singapore)
- 2001: Ambassador of the Arts (Rotary Club, Singapore)
- 2011: Meritorious Award (COMPASS Singapore)

== Achievements ==
In 2004, at the 3rd Choir Games held at Bremen, Germany, Kwei achieved 6 gold medals with the Victoria Junior College Choir and a gold diploma with Victora Chorale.

In 2006, at the 4th World Choir Games held at Xiamen, China, Kwei led the Anderson Junior College Choir to a gold medal and the Victora Chorale to a gold medal.

In 2008, with the Anderson Junior College Choir, Kwei led the choir to the "Grand Prize" & "Audience Prize" at the Concorso Corale Internazionale held in Riva Del Garda, Italy. He was also awarded the "Conductor Prize".
