= Bahrain at the 2009 Asian Youth Games =

- IOC code: BRN
- NOC: Bahrain Olympic Committee

in Singapore
- Competitors: 22 in 7 sports
- Medals Ranked 21st: Gold 0 Silver 0 Bronze 1 Total 1

Asian Youth Games appearances
- 2009; 2013; 2025

Bahrain competed at the 2009 Asian Youth Games held in Singapore from June 29, 2009 to July 7, 2009. Bahrain sent 22 athletes who competed in 8 sports and finished with 1 bronze medal.

== Medal tally ==
Sport	Gold	Silver	Bronze	Total
Athletics	0	0	1	1
Totals (1 entries)	0	0	1	1

== By sport ==
=== Athletics ===
Bahrain joined the athletics competition at the 2009 Asian Youth Games. As a matter of fact, Bahrain sent the most number of athletes in this sport. The country won one bronze medal in the boys' 4 × 200 m relay event.

==== Boys ====
Athlete	Event	Heats/Round 1		Finals	
Athlete	Event	Result	Rank	Result	Rank
Ali Aldoseri	100 m	11.68	5	Did not advance	
Yunes Asabeel	400 m	53.74	5	Did not advance	
Ali Abdulla; Ali Aldoseri; Yunes Asabeel; Faisal Mohamed; Husain Busafwan (reserve)	4 × 200 m relay	1:33.77	2 Q	1:33.80	Bronze

==== Girls ====
Athlete/s	Event	Heats/Round 1		Finals	
Athlete/s	Event	Result	Rank	Result	Rank
Maryam Al-Ansari	High jump			1.45	11
Maryam Al-Ansari	Triple jump			10.48	7
Dana Ali	100 m	14.70	7	Did not advance	
Bushra Almaliki	400 m	1:09.98	5	Did not advance	
Saleha Lahdan	100 m hurdles	18.85	5	Did not advance	
Maryam Alansari; Dana Ali; Bushra Almaliki; Saleha Lahdan	4 × 200 m relay				

=== Basketball ===
Bahrain joined the girls' division of basketball competition at the 2009 Asian Youth Games. It was joined in Group C with China, India and Singapore. The team was not able to proceed in the next round because it lost all its games in the preliminary round.

Athletes	Event	Preliminary round	Quarterfinals	Semifinals	Finals	Rank
Athletes	Event	Opposition Result	Opposition Result	Opposition Result	Opposition Result	Rank
Nasreen Alsaegh; Jameela Ebrahim; Noora Mohamed; Eman Saleem	Girls' Division	China; L 33-0 (India) India; L 34-2; Singapore; L 33-2	Did not advance			

==== Preliminary round results ====
July 2

China	33–0	Bahrain

July 2

India	34–2	Bahrain

July 3

Bahrain	2–33	Singapore

==== Preliminary round rank ====
Team	Pld	W	L	PF	PA	PD	Pts	Rank	Status
Bahrain	3	0	3	4	100	–96	3	4	Eliminated

=== Beach volleyball ===
Bahrain joined the boys' division of the beach volleyball competition at the 2009 Asian Youth Games. The country sent Mohamed Hammad and Ali Sultan as its representatives. In the preliminary round, Bahrain was joined in Group C with Chinese Taipei, Qatar and Thailand. The pair won one game in its three-games series. It won over Qatar but lost to Chinese Taipei and Thailand. The pair advanced to the quarterfinal round where they battled against the Indonesian pair but lost in two straight sets thus losing hopes of advancing to the next round.

Athletes	Event	Preliminary Round	Quarterfinals	Semifinals	Finals	Rank
Athletes	Event	Opposition Result	Opposition Result	Opposition Result	Opposition Result	Rank
Mohamed Hammad; Ali Sultan	Boys' Division	Qatar; W 2-0 (Chinese Taipei) Chinese Taipei; L 2-1; Thailand; L 2-0	Indonesia; L 2-0	Did not advance		

==== Preliminary round results ====
Date		Score		Set 1	Set 2	Set 3
01 Jul	Mohammed / Hussain (QAT)	0–2	Hammad / Sultan (BRN)	8–21	12–21	
01 Jul	Hammad / Sultan (BRN)	1–2	Chen / Juan (TPE)	14–21	21–19	13–15
02 Jul	Hammad / Sultan (BRN)	0–2	Puangprasert / Prasanok (THA)	21–23	11–21	

==== Preliminary round rank ====
Pos	Team	Pld	W	L	Pts	SW	SL	SR	SPW	SPL	SPR
3	Mohamed Hammad / Ali Sultan (BRN)	3	1	2	4	3	4	0.750	122	119	1.025

=== Bowling ===
Bahrain joined the bowling competition at the 2009 Asian Youth Games. The country sent four athletes who were all male. They all joined the individual, doubles and team competition of the sport but failed to win a medal in any division.

==== Individual/singles ====
The bowling boys' singles competition at the 2009 Asian Youth Games was held on July 1.

Rank	Athlete	Score
27	Ahmed Al-Goud (BRN)	1174
30	Husain Ebrahim (BRN)	1147
39	Taha Selail (BRN)	1112
55	Raed Abdulla (BRN)	1013

==== Doubles ====
The bowling boys' doubles competition at the 2009 Asian Youth Games was held on July 2.

Rank	Team	Score
12	Bahrain (BRN); Husain Ebrahim; Taha Selail	2413
20	Bahrain (BRN); Ahmed Al-Goud; Raed Abdulla	2271

==== Team ====
The bowling boys' team competition at the 2009 Asian Youth Games was held from July 3 to 4.

Rank	Team	Score
6	Bahrain (BRN)	4762

=== Sailing ===
Bahrain also joined the sailing competition at the 2009 Asian Youth Games. It sent one male athlete. He was Faisal Abdulla. Abdulla joined the Boys' Byte CII competition. He placed sixth in that competition with a total score of 63.
