= 2009 Asian Youth Games =

2009 edition of the Asian Youth Games

I Asian Youth Games
- Host city: Singapore
- Motto: Asia's Youth, Our Future
- Nations: 43
- Athletes: 1,237
- Events: 90 in 9 sports
- Opening: 29 June
- Closing: 7 July
- Opened by: Lee Hsien Loong; Prime Minister of Singapore
- Closed by: Timothy Fok; Vice President of the Olympic Council of Asia
- Torch lighter: Tao Li, Remy Ong, Jasmine Ser
- Main venue: Singapore Indoor Stadium
- Website: ayg2009.sg (archived)

2009 Asian Youth Games, officially known as the 1st Asian Youth Games and also known as Singapore 2009, was a pan-continental multi-sport event held in the city state of Singapore from 29 June to 7 July 2009, with 90 events in 9 sports.

The plan for the Asian Youth Games was part of Singapore's bid to stage the 2010 Summer Youth Olympics (YOG). The purpose was to allow youths to use the chance to benchmark their performances against youth teams from Asian nations. The Games also provided Singapore with an opportunity to test organisational and logistical capabilities in advance of the 2010 YOG. The organisation of the Games, spearheaded by the Singapore Sports Council, cost S$15 million, which was part of the $130 million for YOG.

== Torch relay ==
The 1st Asian Youth Games torch relay started on 28 June morning with the Community and Corporate Leg. The flame lighting ceremony was held on 28 June at the Kallang Waterfront. The flame is then carried across the island in buses to arrive at the start of the three routes, named after the Olympic values of Friendship, Excellence and Respect. A total of 70 torchbearers were involved in day one of the relay.

The torch relay resumed on 29 June for the Schools leg, with the flame travelling to 45 schools around Singapore, where over a hundred runners had the honour of carrying the torch.

The relay ended at the Singapore Indoor Stadium where three athletes ran in with the torches and light the cauldron as part of the Opening Ceremony celebrations.

== Branding ==
Official mascot

=== Theme song ===
The theme song entitled Asia's Youth, Our Future was unveiled on 19 March 2009.

The song carries the message of hope and friendship and was composed by musician Iskandar Ismail, and written jointly by Jose Raymond and Hoo Cher Liek.

The singers are Nathan Hartono and Lian Kim Selby.

=== Emblem ===
The official emblem of the 2009 Asian Youth Games was unveiled on 14 November 2008 and designed by Brainwave Design. The logo, as described by Olympic Council of Asia, represents excellence and victory that the athletes will bring during the Games.

=== Mascot ===
Frasia, which means Friends of Asia, is the name of the official mascot for the 1st Asian Youth Games. The mascot embodies the values and spirit of the Asian Youth Games. The sprightly lion exemplifies friendship, respect and excellence. It constitutes a spirited representation of young hearts and minds in pursuit of sporting excellence.

=== Stamps ===
Many countries' postal services have also released stamps, such as Uzbekistan.

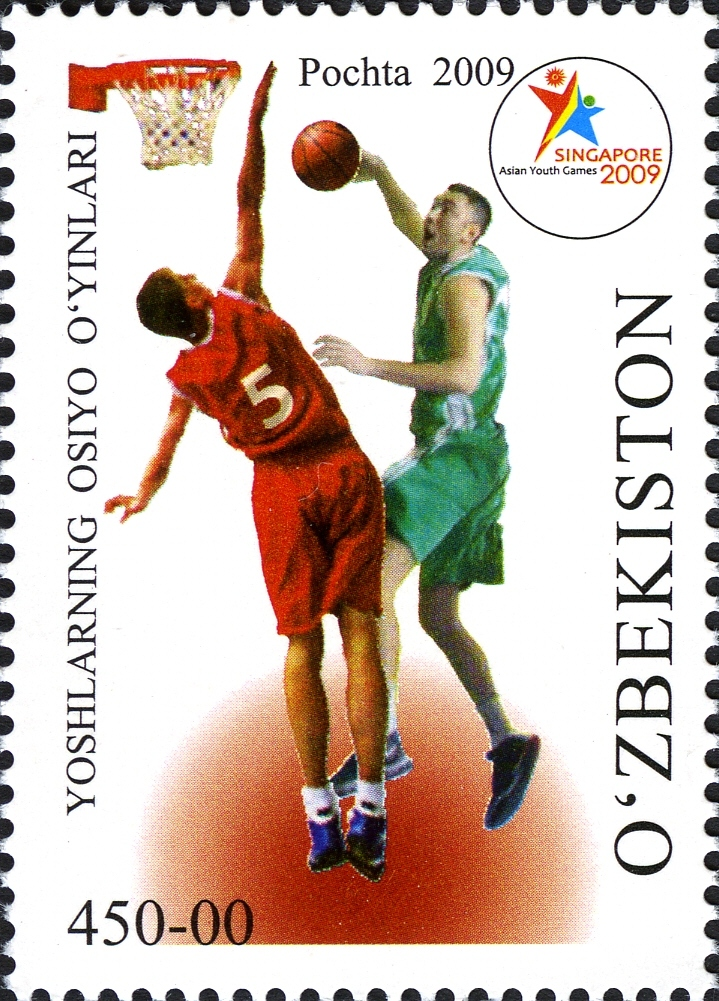
Stamp of Uzbekistan, 2009

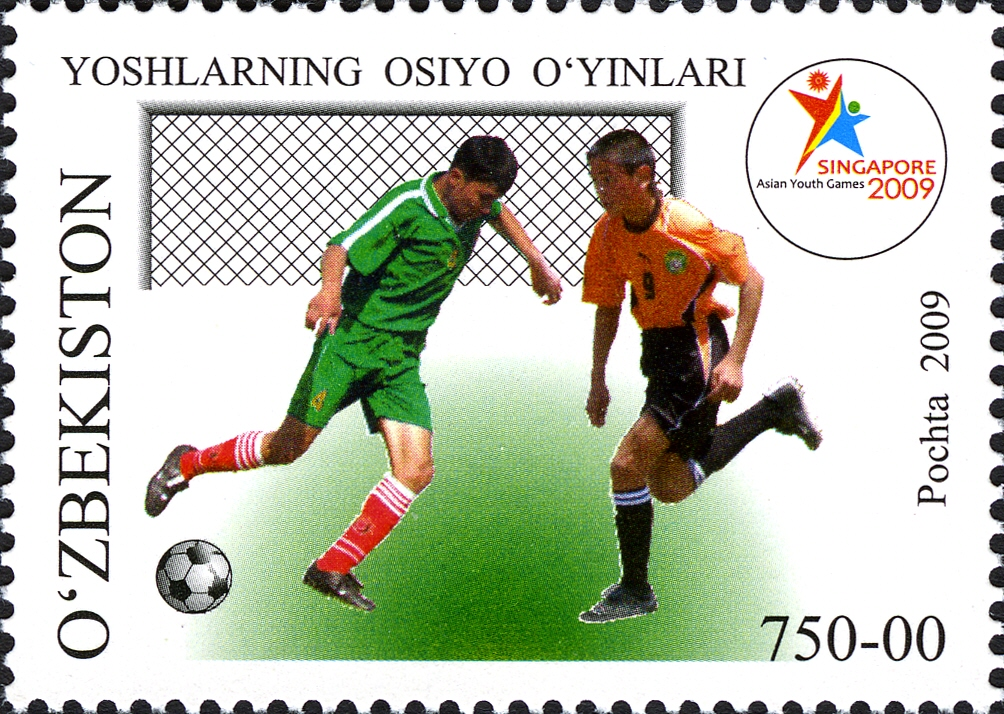
Stamp of Uzbekistan, 2009

== Broadcast ==
The sports events were broadcast 'live' primarily via the official website through 4 concurrent 'live' streams during the games period. It was the first multi-sport event to receive approval from the Olympic Council of Asia to provide broadcast coverage of all the sports events completely via digital channels. Singapore's television channel, MediaCorp Channel 5 provided daily highlights of the Games. StarHub TV had 4 dedicated TV channels to provide coverage for the Games.

The opening ceremony was broadcast 'live' via the website. In addition, Video On-Demand Clips capturing key sporting highlights of the various games were made available.

== Venues ==
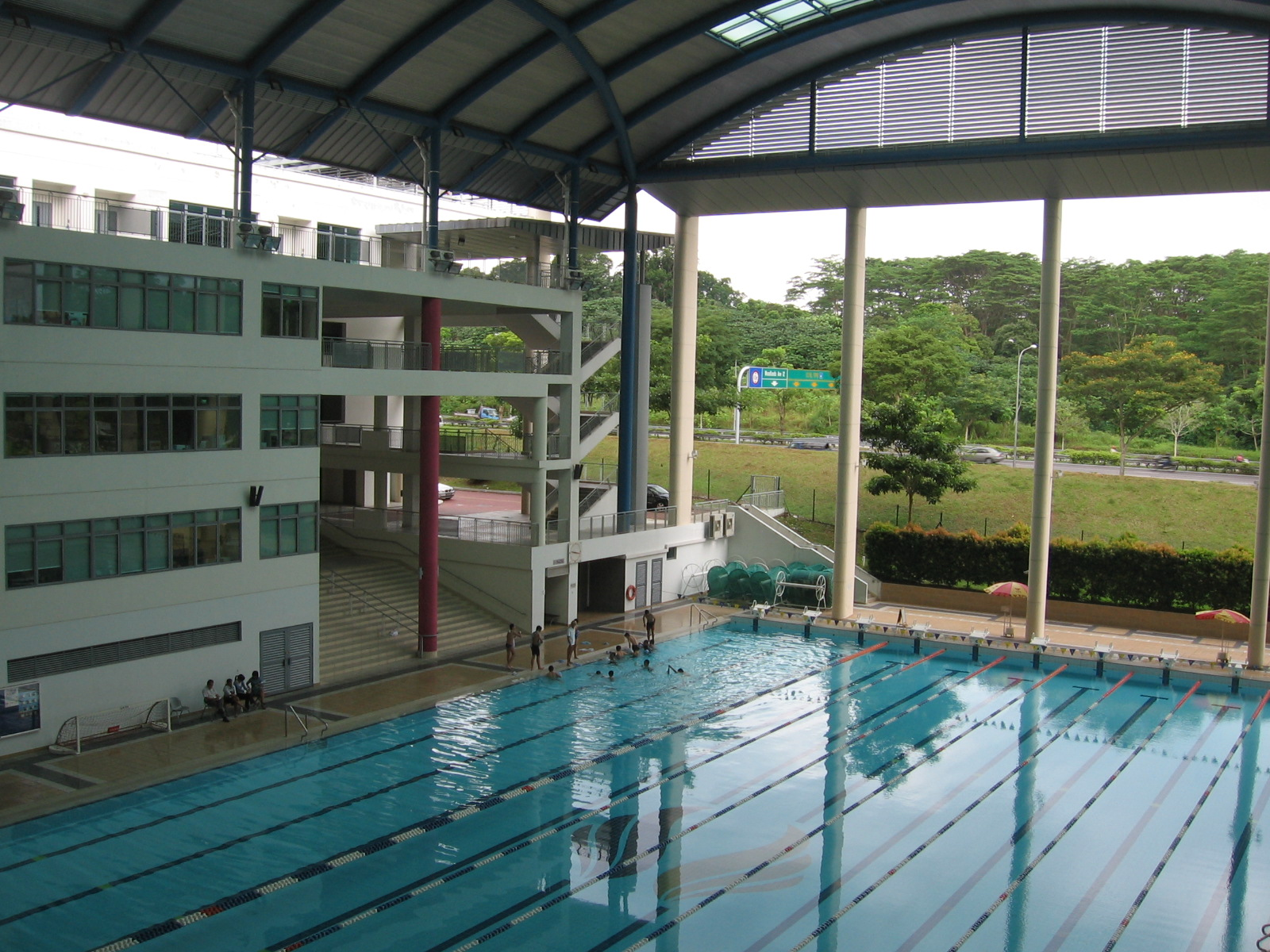
Aquatics-Swimming was held here in the Singapore Sports School

The Asian Youth Games and the 2010 Summer Youth Olympic Games are expected to use the same competition venues.

Venue	Sports
Anglican High School	3x3 basketball
Toa Payoh Swimming Complex	Aquatics Diving
Singapore Sports School	Aquatics Swimming
Bishan Stadium	Athletics
Siloso Beach, Sentosa	Beach volleyball
Orchid Country Club	Bowling
Jalan Besar Stadium	Football
National Sailing Centre	Sailing
SAFRA Yishun	Shooting
Toa Payoh Sports Hall	Table tennis

NTUC Downtown East originally was the planned Games Village for athletes and officials. However, a decision was made to move the Games Village to central Singapore at Swissotel The Stamford. The change was made as NTUC Downtown East does not have enough beds for the athletes. Due to the H1N1 outbreak, Swissotel The Stamford catered the ninth floor to suspect cases in athletes.

== Opening ceremony ==
Themed Asia's Youth, Our Future, the inaugural Asian Youth Games opening ceremony on 29 June was held in the Singapore Indoor Stadium. More than 1,400 performers from 20 schools and tertiary institutions took part in the opening ceremony. The opening ceremony was graced by Singapore Prime Minister Lee Hsien Loong. Representatives from the Olympic Council of Asia and the Singapore National Olympic Council were also present. There were three segments which were showcased: 'Asia's Zest', 'Garden in the City', and 'Spirit Of Evolution'. The AYG cauldron was lit by three Singaporean young athletes, Tao Li (swimming), Remy Ong (bowling), and Jasmine Ser (shooting).

== Participating nations ==
The Singapore Asian Youth Games 2009 saw an estimated 1,300 athletes aged between 14 and 17 from 43 countries competing in more than 80 sporting events.

- Bahrain (22)
- Bangladesh (12)
- Bhutan (2)
- Brunei (2)
- Cambodia (3)
- China (81)
- Hong Kong (46)
- India (48)
- Indonesia (44)
- Iran (54)
- Iraq (6)
- Japan (38)
- Jordan (8)
- Kazakhstan (34)
- Kuwait (35)
- Kyrgyzstan (26)
- Laos (21)
- Lebanon (2)
- Macau (32)
- Malaysia (27)
- Maldives (7)
- Mongolia (27)
- Myanmar (21)
- Nepal (21)
- North Korea (27)
- Oman (6)
- Pakistan (27)
- Palestine (9)
- Philippines (59)
- Qatar (31)
- Saudi Arabia (33)
- Singapore (90)
- South Korea (73)
- Sri Lanka (30)
- Syria (7)
- Chinese Taipei (61)
- Tajikistan (2)
- Thailand (79)
- Turkmenistan (2)
- United Arab Emirates (18)
- Uzbekistan (32)
- Vietnam (28)
- Yemen (4)

== Sports ==
Attempts were made to stage all 26 YOG sports but, due to time and resource constraints, Singapore and the Olympic Council of Asia trimmed it to nine.

There were a total of 9 sports, the 8 that the Singapore and the Olympic Council of Asia trimmed down from the 26 YOG sports as well as an addition sport of Bowling which is not an official Olympics Sport.

- 3x3 basketball (2)
- Aquatics
  - Diving (4)
  - Swimming (32)
- Athletics (28)
- Beach volleyball (2)
- Bowling (8)
- Football (1)
- Sailing (5)
- Shooting (4)
- Table tennis (4)

== Calendar ==
●	Opening ceremony	Event competitions	●	Event finals	●	Closing ceremony

June / July 2009	20th Sat	22nd Mon	24th Wed	27th Sat	29th Mon	30th Tue	1st Wed	2nd Thu	3rd Fri	4th Sat	5th Sun	6th Mon	7th Tue	Gold medals
3x3 basketball										2				2
Athletics						6	3	9	10					28
Beach volleyball											2			2
Bowling							2	2		2		2		8
Diving						2	2							4
Football												1		1
Sailing												5		5
Shooting							1	1	1	1				4
Swimming								4	7	7	7	7		32
Table tennis										1		3		4
Total gold medals						8	8	16	18	13	9	18		90
Ceremonies					●								●	
June / July 2009	20th Sat	22nd Mon	24th Wed	27th Sat	29th Mon	30th Tue	1st Wed	2nd Thu	3rd Fri	4th Sat	5th Sun	6th Mon	7th Tue	Gold medals

== Medal table ==
* Host nation (Singapore)

Rank	Nation	Gold	Silver	Bronze	Total
1	China	25	16	11	52
2	South Korea	20	17	17	54
3	Thailand	11	7	2	20
4	Singapore*	9	6	15	30
5	Hong Kong	5	8	5	18
6	Japan	5	6	4	15
7	India	5	3	3	11
8	Kazakhstan	4	6	4	14
9	Kuwait	3	3	5	11
10	North Korea	1	4	4	9
11	Iran	1	3	2	6
12	Chinese Taipei	1	2	7	10
13	Yemen	1	0	0	1
14	Qatar	0	2	0	2
14	Vietnam	0	2	0	2
16	Saudi Arabia	0	1	2	3
16	Sri Lanka	0	1	2	3
18	Philippines	0	1	1	2
19	Macau	0	1	0	1
20	Uzbekistan	0	0	3	3
21	Bahrain	0	0	1	1
21	Indonesia	0	0	1	1
21	Malaysia	0	0	1	1
21	Myanmar	0	0	1	1
21	Pakistan	0	0	1	1
Totals (25 entries)		91	89	92	272

== Incidents ==
On 19 June, a member of the Philippines football team came down with H1N1 flu, causing the Group A football preliminary match between Philippines and Chinese Taipei due to be played at Meridian Junior College on the same day to be suspended till further notice.

Four cases of H1N1 flu virus were discovered from the Hong Kong football team on 22 June.

Malaysia has withdrawn most of its athletes (with the exception of their sailors) due to concerns over the H1N1 outbreak.

== See also ==
- 2010 Summer Youth Olympics
- 2009 Asian Youth Para Games
