= Malaysia at the 2009 Asian Youth Games =

- IOC code: MAS
- NOC: Olympic Council of Malaysia
- Website: www.olympic.org.my (in English)

in Singapore
- Competitors: 27 in 3 sports
- Medals Ranked 21st: Gold 0 Silver 0 Bronze 1 Total 1

Asian Youth Games appearances
- 2009; 2013; 2025

Malaysia competed in the 2009 Asian Youth Games held in Singapore from 29 June to 7 July 2009. Due to travel restrictions caused by the H1N1 outbreak, Malaysia was limiting participation to only 2 sports; football and sailing. However, the football team is not eligible for the second round and had returned to Malaysia before the games commenced. Two sailors, Muhamad Amirul Shafig Jais and Khairunneeta Mohd Afendy remained in Singapore to take part in Byte CII for boys and girls under 14 years old. Muhamad Amirul Shafig Jais has won a bronze medal in the Boys' Byte CII event while Khairunneeta Mohd Afendy finished in fourth place in the Girls' Byte CII. Chef de Mission for the Games was Marina Chin, Principal of Sekolah Sukan Bukit Jalil. However, she did not attend the games due to the withdrawal of the Malaysian contingent.

== Medallist ==
Medal	Name	Sport	Event	Date
Bronze	Mohd Amirul Shafiq	Sailing	Boys' Byte CII	6 July

== Football ==
=== Boys' tournament ===
Group C

Team	Pld	W	D	L	GF	GA	GD	Pts
Thailand	2	1	0	1	4	4	0	3
North Korea	2	1	0	1	3	3	0	3
Malaysia	2	1	0	1	2	2	0	3

June 22
17:00

Malaysia	1–0	North Korea
Yaakob 38' (pen.)

Victoria Junior College, Singapore
Referee: Leow Thiam Hoe (Singapore)

June 24
17:00

Thailand	2–1	Malaysia
Charoenruen 47' (pen.), 58'		Yaakob 75'

Victoria Junior College, Singapore
Referee: T. Aravinthan (Singapore)

== Sailing ==
Boys

Athlete	Event	Race											Net points	Rank
Athlete	Event	1	2	3	4	5	6	7	8	9	10	11	Net points	Rank
Mohd Amirul Shafiq	Byte CII	~~7~~	3	5	3	3	5	3	4	4	2	2	34	3rd place, bronze medalist(s)

Girls

Athlete	Event	Race											Net points	Rank
Athlete	Event	1	2	3	4	5	6	7	8	9	10	11	Net points	Rank
Khairunnisa Afendy	Byte CII	5	3	4	~~10~~	4	1	2	3	2	4	1	29	4

Open

Athlete	Event	Boys		Girls		Total	Rank
Athlete	Event	Techno 293	Byte CII	Techno 293	Byte CII	Total	Rank
Mohd Amirul Shafiq; Khairunnisa Afendy	Nations' trophy	-	10	-	6	16	4

== Shooting ==
Boys

Athlete	Event	Qualification		Final	
Athlete	Event	Score	Rank	Score	Rank
Choo Wen Yan	10 m air pistol	did not start		did not advance	
Jonathan Wong Guanjie	10 m air pistol	did not start		did not advance	
Amin Hamzah	10 m air rifle	did not start		did not advance	
Mohd Zubair Mohammad	10 m air rifle	did not start		did not advance	

Girls

Athlete	Event	Qualification		Final	
Athlete	Event	Score	Rank	Score	Rank
Jamiah Maidin	10 m air pistol	did not start		did not advance	
Noor Izzati Jasni	10 m air pistol	did not start		did not advance	
Faezaton Elmia Kamal	10 m air rifle	did not start		did not advance	
Nur Izzati Mohd Sabki	10 m air rifle	did not start		did not advance	
