= Audrey Yong =

Singaporean windsurfer

Personal information
- Full name: Yong Pei Lin
- Nickname: Drey
- Born: October 2, 1994 (age 31) Singapore
- Height: 156 cm (5 ft 1 in)

Sailing career
- Sport: Sailing
- Class(es): RS:One, RS:X

Audrey Yong Pei Lin (Yong Pei Lin, born October 2, 1994) is a Singaporean sailor. She placed 25th in the women's RS:X event at the 2016 Summer Olympics.
