= Anglican High School, Singapore =

Singapore secondary school

- （聖公會中學）圣公会中学; Sekolah Tinggi Anglikan ஆங்கிலிகன் உயர்நிலை பள்ளி
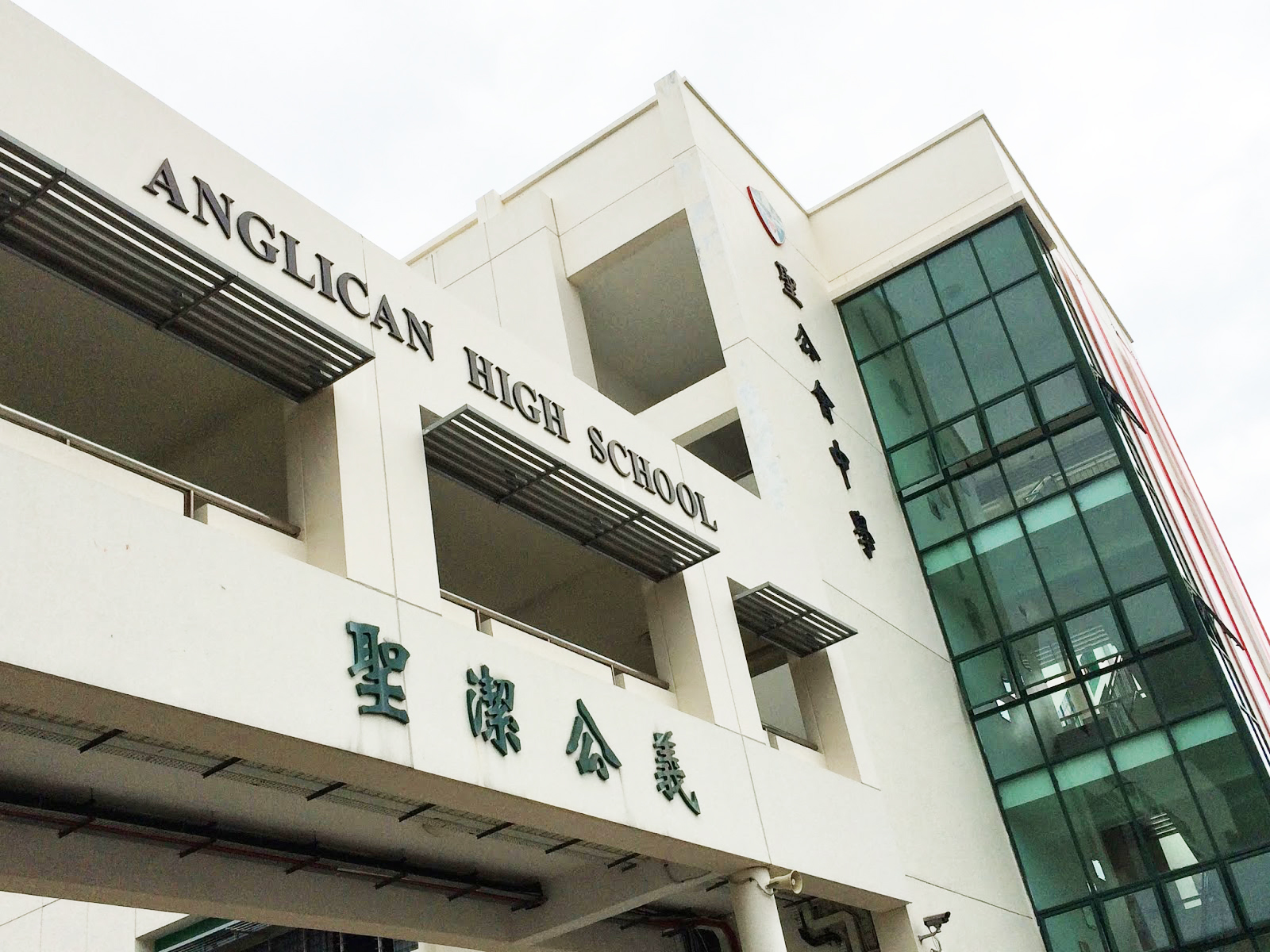

Location
- 600 Upper Changi Road, Singapore 487022
- 1.330302°N 103.941937°E

Information
- Type: Government-aided; Autonomous; Co-educational; Special Assistance Plan (SAP)
- Motto: 聖潔公義 (Aspiring towards Holiness And Righteousness)
- Established: 9 January 1956; 70 years ago
- Session: Single Session
- School code: 7101
- Principal: Lim Hock Chuan Alvin
- Enrolment: 320
- Colour: Green White
- Website: anglicanhigh.moe.edu.sg

Anglican High School (AHS) is a co-educational, government-aided autonomous Anglican secondary school located in Tanah Merah, Singapore. One of the Special Assistance Plan (SAP) schools in Singapore, it offers a four-year secondary education leading to the Singapore-Cambridge GCE Ordinary Level examinations.

== History ==
AHS was founded in 1956 by the Chinese-speaking congregations of the Anglican Diocese of Singapore. It was the only Anglican school in Singapore with Chinese as its medium of instruction. All others were English-medium schools. The school was officially opened on 9 January 1956 under the guidance of Reverend Huang Yang Yin. Three Chinese teachers and three English teachers were employed, and 123 male students started taking lessons at the campus of another Anglican school, Saint Andrew's Secondary School. The school started accepting female students later.

=== Settling at Upper Changi ===
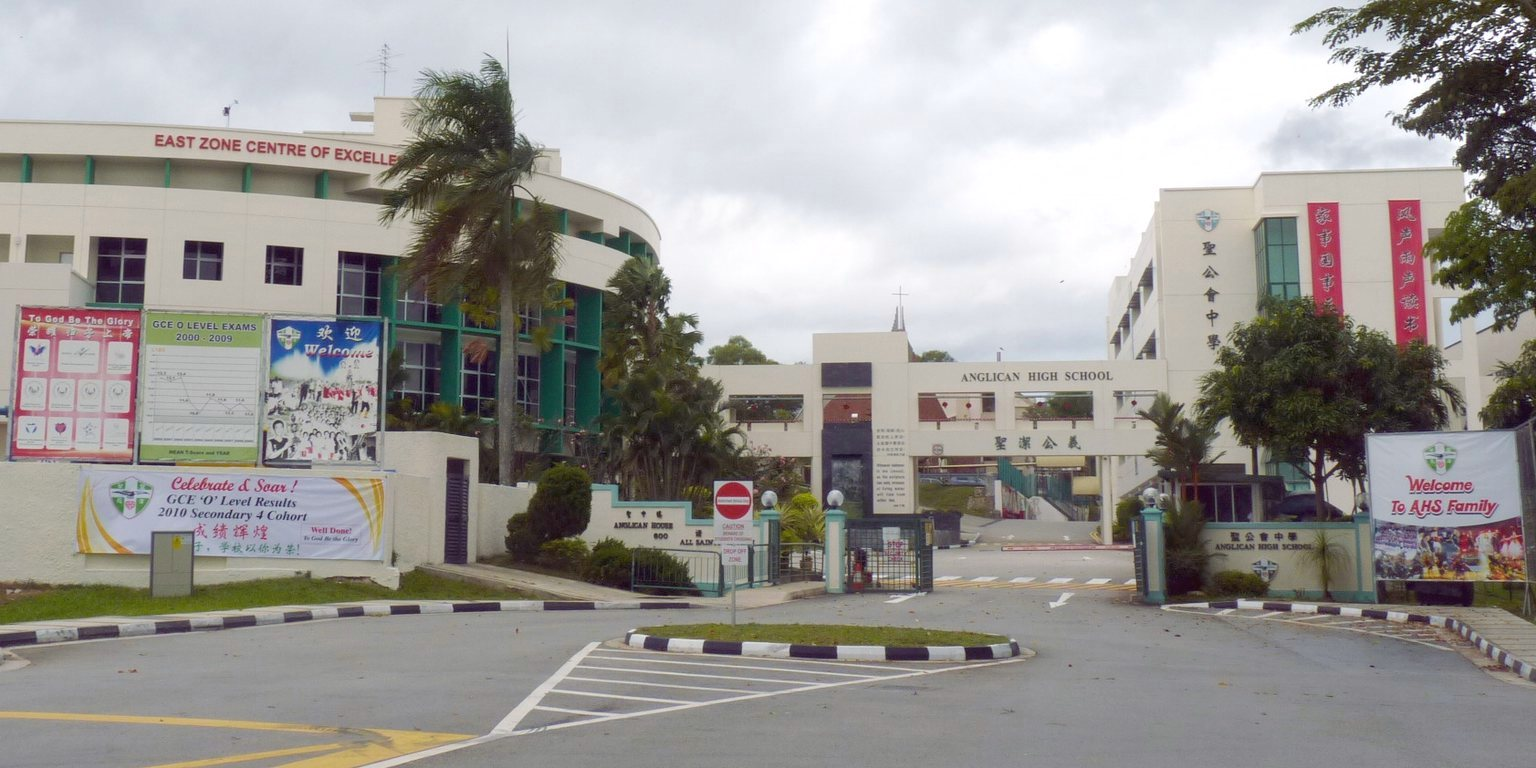
Main gate of Anglican High School viewed from Upper Changi Road

The "8.5 mile" site of the present Upper Changi Road campus was acquired in the late 1950s, and on 15 March 1959, the new school's foundation stone was officially laid by Devasahayam David Chelliah, the Archdeacon of Singapore. It was to be built with a new school facility with 16 classrooms, three science laboratories, an administration-cum-staff room, an assembly hall and a clock-tower. And finally on 25 January 1960, the new AHS officially opened and blessed by Henry Wolfe Baines, the Bishop of Singapore.

=== Obtaining SAP and Autonomous Status ===
Pre-university education (Pre-U 1 and 2) was initially introduced along with the commencement of lessons at the new campus, and was phased out in 1978 when junior colleges were introduced in Singapore. In 1979, AHS became a bilingual Special Assistance Plan school, and in 1995 the government awarded it autonomous status, giving the school greater control over its affairs.

=== Present ===
In 2005, a new school building and the AHS Heritage Centre were officially opened by John Chew, the Bishop of Singapore. An indoor sports hall was completed in 2008 and was the hosting venue for the inaugural 2009 Asian Youth Games FIBA 33 (3-on-3 basketball) event.

The school celebrated its 60th anniversary in 2016, and conducted its first of the kind musical on 18 and 19 March as a commemorative event. Named Chrysalis, more than 300 students and teachers come together to put up the musical. Songs in the musical are composed by AHS teachers.

== School identity and culture ==
=== School uniform ===
AHS's full white uniform is closely linked to its Chinese cultural roots, much like other schools in Singapore with Chinese vernacular backgrounds. Boys wear white studded shirts with five metal buttons (two on the two chest pockets and three on the shirt front), paired with either white short trousers for lower secondary or white long pants for upper secondary level. Girls wear white blouses with three metal buttons on the front, along with a white pleated miniskirt. The buttons used to be detachable but the metal buttons are now sewn onto the uniforms for convenience. The school badge is worn on the left chest level. Student Councillors wear a white shirt with a red tie (regardless of gender) and the respective white bottoms. When representing the school at formal occasions, AHS students wear a red school tie and dark green blazers, along with long pants for boys and unpleated skirts for girls.

=== Discipline ===
AHS has a demerit point system installed along with the discipline guidelines set by the Ministry of Education. One demerit point is given for minor offences (e.g. late-coming or improper attire), three demerit points for serious offences (e.g. truancy or defiance), and five demerit points for very serious offences (e.g. smoking, cheating, bullying, fighting or vandalism). Disciplinary actions include detention, caning (for male students only) and suspension, depending on the seriousness of the offence committed and the frequency of its recurrence. The number of demerit points also affects the student's conduct grade. For offences that involve violation of the law, the school reserves the right to refer the matter to the Police and/or relevant external agencies.

== Co-curricular activities (CCAs) ==
AHS offers a spectrum of co-curricular activities (CCAs) by the Ministry of Education, consisting of sports groups, uniformed groups, performing arts, clubs and societies, totalling to about 24 CCAs.

The performing arts CCAs participate in school-based activities and concerts, and hold annual or bi-annual public concerts.

== School Events ==
=== iLoveAHSWalk & AHS Family Fiesta ===
Since 2013, AHS has been hosting the iLoveAHSWalk annually as part of the school's fundraising programme. In the event held in 2016, the school broke the Singapore Book of Records for the largest piece of mosaic made from close to 30,000 straw hearts that are folded by students and staff.

== Notable alumni ==
- Boon Hui Lu: Singer-songwriter and actress
- Dasmond Koh: Television presenter and DJ
- Jerry Yeo: Actor, Mediacorp
- John Clang: International photographer
- Ho Yeow Sun (Sun Ho): International pop singer
- Nelson Kwei: Music conductor
