= Amir Sedighi =

Iranian basketball player

Personal information
- Born: April 16, 1993 (age 33) Varamin, Iran
- Listed height: 6 ft 8 in (2.03 m)
- Listed weight: 217.8 lb (99 kg)

Career information
- Playing career: 2010–present
- Position: Forward

Career history
- 2010–2015: Mahram Tehran
- 2015–2017: Chemidor Tehran
- 2017–2018: Mahram Tehran
- 2018–2020: Shahrdari Gorgan
- 2020–2021: Naft Abadan
- 2021–2022: Shahrdari Gorgan

Amir Sedighi
Medal record

Men's basketball

Representing Iran

Asian Cup
Gold medal – first place	2012 Tokyo	Team

Amir Sedighi (Persian: امیر صدیقی, born July 16, 1993) is an Iranian professional basketball player who last played for Shahrdari Gorgan in the Iranian Super League as well as for the Iranian national basketball team, as a forward. He is 6'8" in height. He was a member of Iran national youth team attending in 2010 Summer Youth Olympics. Iran finally ranked 12th among 20 teams. Memi Bečirovič introduced him to national team for the first time in 2012 FIBA Asia Cup.
