= Toa Payoh Swimming Complex =

Public swimming pool in Toa Payoh, Singapore

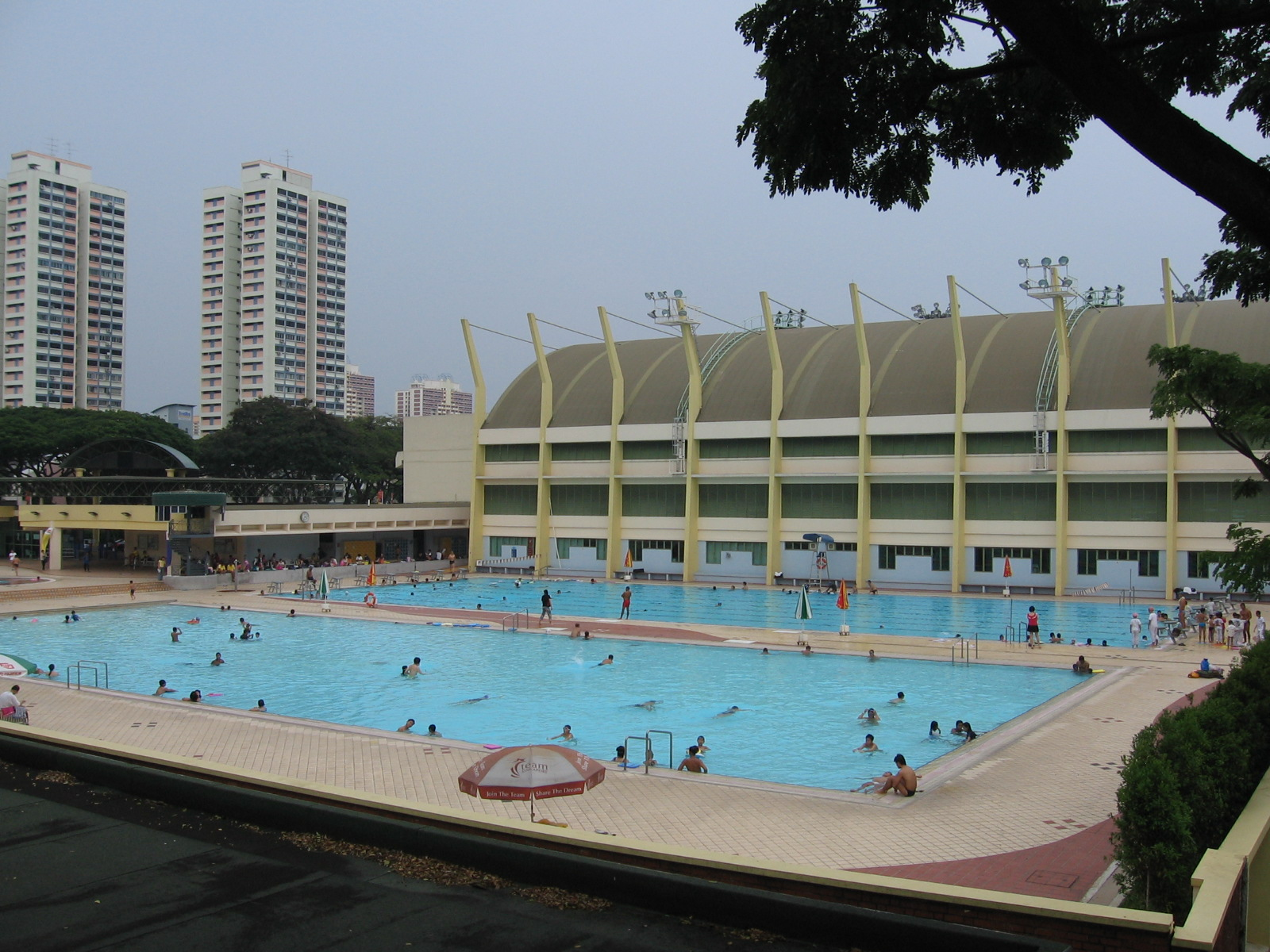
- Toa Payoh Swimming Complex in August 2006
- Interactive map of Toa Payoh Swimming Complex
- Address: 301 Lorong 6 Toa Payoh, Singapore 319392; Singapore
- Coordinates: 1.330492°N 103.850236°E

Construction
- Opened: 24 September 1973; 52 years ago
- Closed: 31 October 2023; 2 years ago

The Toa Payoh Swimming Complex was a public swimming pool managed by Sport Singapore in Toa Payoh, Singapore. It was located at 301 Lorong 6 Toa Payoh.

Together with the Toa Payoh Sports Hall, the Swimming Complex was one of many public swimming complexes operated by the Sport Singapore. The swimming complex itself consisted of five pools, of which three were meant for public use (a wading pool, a teaching pool and a training pool) while the other two in a separate section of the complex were used extensively for elite training by the national teams in the sports of water polo, synchronised swimming and diving.

Toa Payoh Swimming Complex was within walking distance from Toa Payoh MRT station.

== Events ==
Toa Payoh Swimming Complex played host to the National Schools’ Swimming Championships for many years and, since March 2006, hosted the synchronised swimming event of the Asian Swimming Championships.

Most notably, the Toa Payoh Swimming Complex was the venue for the aquatics (diving) event for the inaugural Summer Youth Olympic Games that took place in Singapore in 2010.

The swimming complex closed on 31 October 2023 to make way for the Toa Payoh Integrated Development, which was expected to be completed in 2030.
