= Indonesia at the 2009 Asian Youth Games =

- IOC code: INA
- NOC: Indonesian Olympic Committee
- Website: www.nocindonesia.or.id (in English)

in Singapore
- Competitors: 44
- Medals Ranked 21st: Gold 0 Silver 0 Bronze 1 Total 1

Asian Youth Games appearances
- 2009; 2013; 2025

Indonesia participated in the 2009 Asian Youth Games in Singapore on 29 June – 7 July 2009.

Indonesia sent 44 athletes. Indonesia finished with 1 bronze medal which they got in beach volleyball.

== Medalists ==
Medal	Name	Sport	Event
Bronze	Ade Candra Rachmawan; I Gede Eka Agustiawan	Beach Volleyball	Men's beach volleyball
