= 2016 Asian Beach Volleyball Championships =

Beach Volleyball Competition

- Location: Sydney, Australia
- Dates: 25–28 March 2016

The 2016 Asian Beach Volleyball Championship was a beach volleyball event, that was held from 25 to 28 March, 2016 in Sydney, Australia.

== Medal summary ==
| Event | Gold | Silver | Bronze |
|---|---|---|---|
| Men | Australia; Isaac Kapa; Chris McHugh | Australia; Bo Soderberg; Cole Durant | Australia; Josh Court; Damien Schumann |
| Women | China; Xue Chen; Xia Xinyi | Australia; Mariafe Artacho del Solar; Nicole Laird | Japan; Miki Ishii; Megumi Murakami |

== Participating nations ==
=== Men ===
- Australia (4)
- China (2)
- Hong Kong (2)
- Indonesia (2)
- Iran (2)
- Japan (2)
- Kazakhstan (2)
- New Zealand (2)
- Oman (1)
- Qatar (2)
- Thailand (2)

=== Women ===
- Australia (4)
- China (2)
- Hong Kong (2)
- Indonesia (2)
- Japan (2)
- Kazakhstan (2)
- New Zealand (2)
- Singapore (2)
- Thailand (2)
- Vanuatu (2)

== Men's tournament ==
=== Preliminary round ===
==== Pool A ====
| Pos | Team | Pld | W | L | Pts | SW | SL | SR | SPW | SPL | SPR |
|---|---|---|---|---|---|---|---|---|---|---|---|
| 1 | (Australia) Kapa–McHugh | 1 | 1 | 0 | 2 | 2 | 0 | MAX | 42 | 35 | 1.200 |
| 2 | (Oman) Ahmed–Badar | 1 | 0 | 1 | 1 | 0 | 2 | 0.000 | 35 | 42 | 0.833 |

Source: AVC

| Date | | Score | | Set 1 | Set 2 | Set 3 |
|---|---|---|---|---|---|---|
| 25 Mar | Kapa–McHugh (Australia) | 2–0 | (Oman) Ahmed–Badar | 21–17 | 21–18 | |

==== Pool B ====
| Pos | Team | Pld | W | L | Pts | SW | SL | SR | SPW | SPL | SPR |
|---|---|---|---|---|---|---|---|---|---|---|---|
| 1 | (Qatar) Jefferson–Cherif | 2 | 2 | 0 | 4 | 4 | 0 | MAX | 86 | 69 | 1.246 |
| 2 | (New Zealand) Ben O'Dea–Lochhead | 2 | 1 | 1 | 3 | 2 | 2 | 1.000 | 71 | 65 | 1.092 |
| 3 | (Indonesia) Candra–Rendy | 2 | 0 | 2 | 2 | 0 | 4 | 0.000 | 63 | 86 | 0.733 |

Source: AVC

| Date | | Score | | Set 1 | Set 2 | Set 3 |
|---|---|---|---|---|---|---|
| 25 Mar | Jefferson–Cherif (Qatar) | 2–0 | (New Zealand) Ben O'Dea–Lochhead | 21–15 | 21–14 | |
| 25 Mar | Candra–Rendy (Indonesia) | 0–2 | (New Zealand) Ben O'Dea–Lochhead | 12–21 | 11–21 | |
| 26 Mar | Jefferson–Cherif (Qatar) | 2–0 | (Indonesia) Candra–Rendy | 23–21 | 21–19 | |

==== Pool C ====
| Pos | Team | Pld | W | L | Pts | SW | SL | SR | SPW | SPL | SPR |
|---|---|---|---|---|---|---|---|---|---|---|---|
| 1 | (New Zealand) Watson–Sam O'Dea | 2 | 2 | 0 | 4 | 4 | 0 | MAX | 84 | 51 | 1.647 |
| 2 | (Japan) Takahashi–Ageba | 2 | 1 | 1 | 3 | 2 | 2 | 1.000 | 73 | 72 | 1.014 |
| 3 | (Hong Kong) Wong Chun–Wong Kwun | 2 | 0 | 2 | 2 | 0 | 4 | 0.000 | 50 | 84 | 0.595 |

Source: AVC

| Date | | Score | | Set 1 | Set 2 | Set 3 |
|---|---|---|---|---|---|---|
| 25 Mar | Watson–Sam O'Dea (New Zealand) | 2–0 | (Hong Kong) Wong Chun–Wong Kwun | 21–11 | 21–9 | |
| 25 Mar | Takahashi–Ageba (Japan) | 2–0 | (Hong Kong) Wong Chun–Wong Kwun | 21–16 | 21–14 | |
| 26 Mar | Watson–Sam O'Dea (New Zealand) | 2–0 | (Japan) Takahashi–Ageba | 21–15 | 21–16 | |

==== Pool D ====
| Pos | Team | Pld | W | L | Pts | SW | SL | SR | SPW | SPL | SPR |
|---|---|---|---|---|---|---|---|---|---|---|---|
| 1 | (Kazakhstan) Bogatu–Sidorenko | 2 | 2 | 0 | 4 | 4 | 1 | 4.000 | 98 | 76 | 1.289 |
| 2 | (Indonesia) Fahriansyah–Ashfiya | 2 | 1 | 1 | 3 | 3 | 3 | 1.000 | 103 | 103 | 1.000 |
| 3 | (Thailand) Adisorn–Nuttanon | 2 | 0 | 2 | 2 | 1 | 4 | 0.250 | 76 | 98 | 0.776 |

Source: AVC

| Date | | Score | | Set 1 | Set 2 | Set 3 |
|---|---|---|---|---|---|---|
| 25 Mar | Bogatu–Sidorenko (Kazakhstan) | 2–0 | (Thailand) Adisorn–Nuttanon | 21–15 | 21–14 | |
| 25 Mar | Fahriansyah–Ashfiya (Indonesia) | 2–1 | (Thailand) Adisorn–Nuttanon | 20–22 | 21–15 | 15–10 |
| 26 Mar | Bogatu–Sidorenko (Kazakhstan) | 2–1 | (Indonesia) Fahriansyah–Ashfiya | 20–22 | 21–15 | 15–10 |

==== Pool E ====
| Pos | Team | Pld | W | L | Pts | SW | SL | SR | SPW | SPL | SPR |
|---|---|---|---|---|---|---|---|---|---|---|---|
| 1 | (China) Li Jian–Li Zhuoxin | 2 | 2 | 0 | 4 | 4 | 2 | 2.000 | 116 | 101 | 1.149 |
| 2 | (Australia) Grice–Schubert | 2 | 1 | 1 | 3 | 3 | 2 | 1.500 | 92 | 90 | 1.022 |
| 3 | (Iran) Houshmand–Pourasgari | 2 | 0 | 2 | 2 | 1 | 4 | 0.250 | 83 | 100 | 0.830 |

Source: AVC

| Date | | Score | | Set 1 | Set 2 | Set 3 |
|---|---|---|---|---|---|---|
| 25 Mar | Li Jian–Li Zhuoxin (China) | 2–1 | (Australia) Grice–Schubert | 22–24 | 21–17 | 15–9 |
| 25 Mar | Houshmand–Pourasgari (Iran) | 0–2 | (Australia) Grice–Schubert | 17–21 | 15–21 | |
| 26 Mar | Li Jian–Li Zhuoxin (China) | 2–1 | (Iran) Houshmand–Pourasgari | 19–21 | 24–22 | 15–8 |

==== Pool F ====
| Pos | Team | Pld | W | L | Pts | SW | SL | SR | SPW | SPL | SPR |
|---|---|---|---|---|---|---|---|---|---|---|---|
| 1 | (Australia) Soderberg–Durant | 2 | 2 | 0 | 4 | 4 | 1 | 4.000 | 96 | 83 | 1.157 |
| 2 | (Qatar) Júlio–Ahmed | 2 | 1 | 1 | 3 | 2 | 2 | 1.000 | 83 | 83 | 1.000 |
| 3 | (Iran) Raoufi–Salemi | 2 | 0 | 2 | 2 | 1 | 4 | 0.250 | 84 | 97 | 0.866 |

Source: AVC

| Date | | Score | | Set 1 | Set 2 | Set 3 |
|---|---|---|---|---|---|---|
| 25 Mar | Raoufi–Salemi (Iran) | 0–2 | (Qatar) Júlio–Ahmed | 20–22 | 20–22 | |
| 25 Mar | Soderberg–Durant (Australia) | 2–0 | (Qatar) Júlio–Ahmed | 21–19 | 22–20 | |
| 26 Mar | Raoufi–Salemi (Iran) | 1–2 | (Australia) Soderberg–Durant | 11–21 | 21–17 | 12–15 |

==== Pool G ====
| Pos | Team | Pld | W | L | Pts | SW | SL | SR | SPW | SPL | SPR |
|---|---|---|---|---|---|---|---|---|---|---|---|
| 1 | (Australia) Court–Schumann | 2 | 2 | 0 | 4 | 4 | 1 | 4.000 | 95 | 80 | 1.188 |
| 2 | (Kazakhstan) Yakovlev–Kuleshov | 2 | 1 | 1 | 3 | 3 | 2 | 1.500 | 93 | 91 | 1.022 |
| 3 | (Thailand) Banlue–Prathip | 2 | 0 | 2 | 2 | 0 | 4 | 0.000 | 67 | 84 | 0.798 |

Source: AVC

| Date | | Score | | Set 1 | Set 2 | Set 3 |
|---|---|---|---|---|---|---|
| 25 Mar | Court–Schumann (Australia) | 2–0 | (Thailand) Banlue–Prathip | 21–12 | 21–17 | |
| 25 Mar | Court–Schumann (Australia) | 2–1 | (Kazakhstan) Yakovlev–Kuleshov | 21–19 | 17–21 | 15–11 |
| 26 Mar | Yakovlev–Kuleshov (Kazakhstan) | 2–0 | (Thailand) Banlue–Prathip | 21–19 | 21–19 | |

==== Pool H ====
| Pos | Team | Pld | W | L | Pts | SW | SL | SR | SPW | SPL | SPR |
|---|---|---|---|---|---|---|---|---|---|---|---|
| 1 | (Japan) Shiratori–Hasegawa | 2 | 2 | 0 | 4 | 4 | 1 | 4.000 | 96 | 81 | 1.185 |
| 2 | (China) Bao J.–Ha Likejiang | 2 | 1 | 1 | 3 | 3 | 2 | 1.500 | 93 | 86 | 1.081 |
| 3 | (Hong Kong) Kelvin–Lam | 2 | 0 | 2 | 2 | 0 | 4 | 0.000 | 62 | 84 | 0.738 |

Source: AVC

| Date | | Score | | Set 1 | Set 2 | Set 3 |
|---|---|---|---|---|---|---|
| 25 Mar | Shiratori–Hasegawa (Japan) | 2–0 | (Hong Kong) Kelvin–Lam | 21–19 | 21–11 | |
| 25 Mar | Bao J.–Ha Likejiang (China) | 2–0 | (Hong Kong) Kelvin–Lam | 21–15 | 21–17 | |
| 26 Mar | Shiratori–Hasegawa (Japan) | 2–1 | (China) Bao J.–Ha Likejiang | 21–17 | 18–21 | 15–13 |

=== Knockout round ===
Round of 16; 26 March
(China) Li Jian–Li Zhuoxin | 20 | 18
(China) Bao J.–Ha Likejiang | 22 | 21
(Australia) Kapa–McHugh | 18 | 23 | 15
(Indonesia) Fahriansyah–Ashfiya | 21 | 21 | 11
(Kazakhstan) Bogatu–Sidorenko | 16 | 14
(New Zealand) Ben O'Dea–Lochhead | 21 | 21
(Japan) Shiratori–Hasegawa | 18 | 25 | 15
(Australia) Grice–Schubert | 21 | 23 | 9
(Qatar) Jefferson–Cherif | 21 | 21
(Japan) Takahashi–Ageba | 11 | 13
(Australia) Soderberg–Durant | 21 | 32
(Kazakhstan) Yakovlev–Kuleshov | 18 | 30
(New Zealand) Watson–Sam O'Dea | 21 | 21
(Oman) Ahmed–Badar | 17 | 11
(Australia) Court–Schumann | 17 | 21 | 15
(Qatar) Júlio–Ahmed | 21 | 17 | 9

Quarterfinals; 27 March
(China) Bao J.–Ha Likejiang | 23 | 21 | 7
(Australia) Kapa–McHugh | 25 | 16 | 15
(New Zealand) Ben O'Dea–Lochhead | 21 | 21
(Japan) Shiratori–Hasegawa | 17 | 13
(Qatar) Jefferson–Cherif | 14 | 16
(Australia) Soderberg–Durant | 21 | 21
(New Zealand) Watson–Sam O'Dea | 22 | 24
(Australia) Court–Schumann | 24 | 26

Semifinals; 27 March
(Australia) Kapa–McHugh | 21 | 17 | 15
(New Zealand) Ben O'Dea–Lochhead | 18 | 21 | 12
(Australia) Soderberg–Durant | 21 | 21
(Australia) Court–Schumann | 19 | 16

Final; 28 March
(Australia) Kapa–McHugh | 21 | 19 | 15
(Australia) Soderberg–Durant | 10 | 21 | 12
3rd place
(New Zealand) Ben O'Dea–Lochhead | 19 | 21 | 11
(Australia) Court–Schumann | 21 | 19 | 15

== Women's tournament ==
=== Preliminary round ===
==== Pool A ====
| Pos | Team | Pld | W | L | Pts | SW | SL | SR | SPW | SPL | SPR |
|---|---|---|---|---|---|---|---|---|---|---|---|
| 1 | (Australia) Artacho del Solar–Laird | 1 | 1 | 0 | 2 | 2 | 0 | MAX | 42 | 23 | 1.826 |
| 2 | (Indonesia) Yokebad–Desi | 1 | 0 | 1 | 1 | 0 | 2 | 0.000 | 23 | 42 | 0.548 |

Source: AVC

| Date | | Score | | Set 1 | Set 2 | Set 3 |
|---|---|---|---|---|---|---|
| 25 Mar | Artacho del Solar–Laird (Australia) | 2–0 | (Indonesia) Yokebad–Desi | 21–14 | 21–9 | |

==== Pool B ====
| Pos | Team | Pld | W | L | Pts | SW | SL | SR | SPW | SPL | SPR |
|---|---|---|---|---|---|---|---|---|---|---|---|
| 1 | (Vanuatu) Pata–Matauatu | 1 | 1 | 0 | 2 | 2 | 0 | MAX | 42 | 21 | 2.000 |
| 2 | (Kazakhstan) Samalikova–Lassyuta | 1 | 0 | 1 | 1 | 0 | 2 | 0.000 | 21 | 42 | 0.500 |

Source: AVC

| Date | | Score | | Set 1 | Set 2 | Set 3 |
|---|---|---|---|---|---|---|
| 25 Mar | Pata–Matauatu (Vanuatu) | 2–0 | (Kazakhstan) Samalikova–Lassyuta | 21–15 | 21–6 | |

==== Pool C ====
| Pos | Team | Pld | W | L | Pts | SW | SL | SR | SPW | SPL | SPR |
|---|---|---|---|---|---|---|---|---|---|---|---|
| 1 | (Japan) Take–Mizoe | 2 | 2 | 0 | 4 | 4 | 0 | MAX | 84 | 48 | 1.750 |
| 2 | (Australia) Battaglene–Palmer | 2 | 1 | 1 | 3 | 2 | 2 | 1.000 | 74 | 62 | 1.194 |
| 3 | (Vanuatu) Joe–Toko | 2 | 0 | 2 | 2 | 0 | 4 | 0.000 | 36 | 84 | 0.429 |

Source: AVC

| Date | | Score | | Set 1 | Set 2 | Set 3 |
|---|---|---|---|---|---|---|
| 25 Mar | Take–Mizoe (Japan) | 2–0 | (Australia) Battaglene–Palmer | 21–14 | 21–18 | |
| 25 Mar | Battaglene–Palmer (Australia) | 2–0 | (Vanuatu) Joe–Toko | 21–9 | 21–11 | |
| 25 Mar | Take–Mizoe (Japan) | 2–0 | (Vanuatu) Joe–Toko | 21–6 | 21–10 | |

==== Pool D ====
| Pos | Team | Pld | W | L | Pts | SW | SL | SR | SPW | SPL | SPR |
|---|---|---|---|---|---|---|---|---|---|---|---|
| 1 | (Kazakhstan) Mashkova–Tsimbalova | 2 | 2 | 0 | 4 | 4 | 0 | MAX | 84 | 45 | 1.867 |
| 2 | (Australia) Kendall–Jenkins | 2 | 1 | 1 | 3 | 2 | 2 | 1.000 | 60 | 65 | 0.923 |
| 3 | (Hong Kong) W.T. To–Koo | 2 | 0 | 2 | 2 | 0 | 4 | 0.000 | 50 | 84 | 0.595 |

Source: AVC

| Date | | Score | | Set 1 | Set 2 | Set 3 |
|---|---|---|---|---|---|---|
| 25 Mar | Mashkova–Tsimbalova (Kazakhstan) | 2–0 | (Hong Kong) W.T. To–Koo | 21–15 | 21–12 | |
| 25 Mar | W.T. To–Koo (Hong Kong) | 0–2 | (Australia) Kendall–Jenkins | 14–21 | 9–21 | |
| 25 Mar | Mashkova–Tsimbalova (Kazakhstan) | 2–0 | (Australia) Kendall–Jenkins | 21–5 | 21–13 | |

==== Pool E ====
| Pos | Team | Pld | W | L | Pts | SW | SL | SR | SPW | SPL | SPR |
|---|---|---|---|---|---|---|---|---|---|---|---|
| 1 | (China) Xue–X.Y. Xia | 2 | 2 | 0 | 4 | 4 | 0 | MAX | 84 | 46 | 1.826 |
| 2 | (Hong Kong) Cat–Yuen Mei | 2 | 1 | 1 | 3 | 2 | 2 | 1.000 | 75 | 67 | 1.119 |
| 3 | (Singapore) Ong–Gabrielle Gomes | 2 | 0 | 2 | 2 | 0 | 4 | 0.000 | 38 | 84 | 0.452 |

Source: AVC

| Date | | Score | | Set 1 | Set 2 | Set 3 |
|---|---|---|---|---|---|---|
| 25 Mar | Xue–X.Y. Xia (China) | 2–0 | (Hong Kong) Cat–Yuen Mei | 21–18 | 21–15 | |
| 25 Mar | Cat–Yuen Mei (Hong Kong) | 2–0 | (Singapore) Ong–Gabrielle Gomes | 21–14 | 21–11 | |
| 25 Mar | Xue–X.Y. Xia (China) | 2–0 | (Singapore) Ong–Gabrielle Gomes | 21–5 | 21–8 | |

==== Pool F ====
| Pos | Team | Pld | W | L | Pts | SW | SL | SR | SPW | SPL | SPR |
|---|---|---|---|---|---|---|---|---|---|---|---|
| 1 | (Thailand) Radarong–Udomchavee | 2 | 2 | 0 | 4 | 4 | 0 | MAX | 84 | 50 | 1.680 |
| 2 | (New Zealand) Bagge–Ruru | 2 | 1 | 1 | 3 | 2 | 2 | 1.000 | 63 | 76 | 0.829 |
| 3 | (Australia) Jordan–Justine | 2 | 0 | 2 | 2 | 0 | 4 | 0.000 | 63 | 84 | 0.750 |

Source: AVC

| Date | | Score | | Set 1 | Set 2 | Set 3 |
|---|---|---|---|---|---|---|
| 25 Mar | Radarong–Udomchavee (Thailand) | 2–0 | (New Zealand) Bagge–Ruru | 21–8 | 21–13 | |
| 25 Mar | Radarong–Udomchavee (Thailand) | 2–0 | (Australia) Jordan–Justine | 21–11 | 21–18 | |
| 25 Mar | Jordan–Justine (Australia) | 0–2 | (New Zealand) Bagge–Ruru | 17–21 | 17–21 | |

==== Pool G ====
| Pos | Team | Pld | W | L | Pts | SW | SL | SR | SPW | SPL | SPR |
|---|---|---|---|---|---|---|---|---|---|---|---|
| 1 | (China) Tang N.Y.–Chen Chunxia | 2 | 2 | 0 | 4 | 4 | 0 | MAX | 84 | 50 | 1.680 |
| 2 | (Thailand) Hongpak–Numwong | 2 | 1 | 1 | 3 | 2 | 2 | 1.000 | 75 | 63 | 1.190 |
| 3 | (Singapore) Lau–Chong | 2 | 0 | 2 | 2 | 0 | 4 | 0.000 | 38 | 84 | 0.452 |

Source: AVC

| Date | | Score | | Set 1 | Set 2 | Set 3 |
|---|---|---|---|---|---|---|
| 25 Mar | Tang N.Y.–Chen Chunxia (China) | 2–0 | (Thailand) Hongpak–Numwong | 21–14 | 21–19 | |
| 25 Mar | Hongpak–Numwong (Thailand) | 2–0 | (Singapore) Lau–Chong | 21–14 | 21–7 | |
| 25 Mar | Tang N.Y.–Chen Chunxia (China) | 2–0 | (Singapore) Lau–Chong | 21–11 | 21–6 | |

==== Pool H ====
| Pos | Team | Pld | W | L | Pts | SW | SL | SR | SPW | SPL | SPR |
|---|---|---|---|---|---|---|---|---|---|---|---|
| 1 | (Japan) Ishii–Murakami | 2 | 2 | 0 | 4 | 4 | 0 | MAX | 84 | 62 | 1.355 |
| 2 | (Indonesia) Putu–Dhita | 2 | 1 | 1 | 3 | 2 | 2 | 1.000 | 73 | 63 | 1.159 |
| 3 | (New Zealand) Bain–Quigley | 2 | 0 | 2 | 2 | 0 | 4 | 0.000 | 52 | 84 | 0.619 |

Source: AVC

| Date | | Score | | Set 1 | Set 2 | Set 3 |
|---|---|---|---|---|---|---|
| 25 Mar | Putu–Dhita (Indonesia) | 0–2 | (Japan) Ishii–Murakami | 15–21 | 16–21 | |
| 25 Mar | Ishii–Murakami (Japan) | 2–0 | (New Zealand) Bain–Quigley | 21–12 | 21–9 | |
| 25 Mar | Putu–Dhita (Indonesia) | 2–0 | (New Zealand) Bain–Quigley | 21–14 | 21–17 | |

=== Knockout round ===
Round of 16; 26 March
(China) Tang N.Y.–Chen Chunxia | 21 | 21
(New Zealand) Bagge–Ruru | 8 | 13
(Australia) Artacho del Solar–Laird | 22 | 21 | 15
(Australia) Battaglene–Palmer | 24 | 16 | 12
(Japan) Take–Mizoe | 21 | 21
(Indonesia) Yokebad–Desi | 12 | 11
(Thailand) Radarong–Udomchavee | 21 | 21
(Thailand) Hongpak–Numwong | 13 | 12
(China) Xue–X.Y. Xia | 21 | 21
(Indonesia) Putu–Dhita | 16 | 18
(Kazakhstan) Mashkova–Tsimbalova | 21 | 13 | 15
(Kazakhstan) Samalikova–Lassyuta | 16 | 21 | 10
(Japan) Ishii–Murakami | 21 | 21
(Hong Kong) Cat–Yuen Mei | 10 | 3
(Vanuatu) Pata–Matauatu | 21 | 21
(Australia) Kendall–Jenkins | 9 | 18

Quarterfinals; 26 March
(China) Tang N.Y.–Chen Chunxia | 19 | 13
(Australia) Artacho del Solar–Laird | 21 | 21
(Japan) Take–Mizoe | 21 | 18 | 10
(Thailand) Radarong–Udomchavee | 14 | 21 | 15
(China) Xue–X.Y. Xia | 21 | 21
(Kazakhstan) Mashkova–Tsimbalova | 15 | 18
(Japan) Ishii–Murakami | 22 | 15 | 15
(Vanuatu) Pata–Matauatu | 20 | 21 | 13

Semifinals; 27 March
(Australia) Artacho del Solar–Laird | 23 | 21 | 15
(Thailand) Radarong–Udomchavee | 25 | 15 | 11
(China) Xue–X.Y. Xia | 21 | 21
(Japan) Ishii–Murakami | 12 | 8

Final; 28 March
(Australia) Artacho del Solar–Laird | 17 | 10
(China) Xue–X.Y. Xia | 21 | 21
3rd place
(Thailand) Radarong–Udomchavee | 19 | 21 | 13
(Japan) Ishii–Murakami | 21 | 15 | 15
