= Philippines women's national beach volleyball team results and fixtures =

Women's national beach volleyball team

The following is a list of fixtures and results of the Philippines women's national beach volleyball team against other national teams.

== Fixtures and results ==
=== 1998 ===
Date	Competition	Location	Representative	Opponent	Result
1998
December 1998	1998 Asian Games	Chonburi, Thailand	(Philippines) Helen Dosdos (Philippines) Gina Miguel	(Indonesia) Yohana Marawali (Indonesia) Betty Renjaan	0-1 L (12-15)
December 1998	1998 Asian Games	Chonburi, Thailand	(Philippines) Helen Dosdos (Philippines) Gina Miguel	(Thailand) Kamoltip Kulna (Thailand) Wilaiwan Katmanee	0-1 L (3-15)

=== 2005 ===
Date	Competition	Location	Representative	Opponent	Result
2005
November to December 2005	2005 Southeast Asian Games	Bacolod, Philippines	(Philippines) Heidi Illustre (Philippines) Diane Pascua	(Vietnam) Mai Thi Hoa (Vietnam) Nguyen Thi Tiep	2-0 W (21-12, 21-19)
November to December 2005	2005 Southeast Asian Games	Bacolod, Philippines	(Philippines) Michelle Laborte (Philippines) Cecille Tabuena	(Thailand) Kamoltip Kulna (Thailand) Jarunee Sannok	0-2 L (10-21, 14-21)
November to December 2005	2005 Southeast Asian Games	Bacolod, Philippines	(Philippines) Michelle Laborte (Philippines) Cecille Tabuena	(Indonesia) Ni Putu Timy Yudhani Rahayu (Indonesia) Devota Saveriana Rahawarin	0-2 L (11-21, 16-21)
November to December 2005	2005 Southeast Asian Games	Bacolod, Philippines	(Philippines) Heidi Illustre (Philippines) Diane Pascua	(Malaysia) Lim Poh Hong (Malaysia) Iswari Manokharan	2-0 W (21-13, 21-15)
November to December 2005	2005 Southeast Asian Games	Bacolod, Philippines	(Philippines) Heidi Illustre (Philippines) Diane Pascua	(Philippines) Michelle Laborte (Philippines) Cecille Tabuena	2-0 W (21-13, 21-15)
November to December 2005	2005 Southeast Asian Games	Bacolod, Philippines	(Philippines) Heidi Illustre (Philippines) Diane Pascua	(Thailand) Kamoltip Kulna (Thailand) Jarunee Sannok	1-2 L (12-21, 21-14, 9-15)
November to December 2005	2005 Southeast Asian Games	Bacolod, Philippines	(Philippines) Heidi Illustre (Philippines) Diane Pascua	(Indonesia) Ni Putu Timy Yudhani Rahayu (Indonesia) Devota Saveriana Rahawarin	2-0 W (21-19, 21-16)

=== 2006 ===
Date	Competition	Location	Representative	Opponent	Result
2006
December 2006	2006 Asian Games	Doha, Qatar	(Philippines) Heidi Illustre (Philippines) Diane Pascua	(Kazakhstan) Marina Storozhenko (Kazakhstan) Yelena Alenkina	2-1 W (21-16, 11-21, 17-15)
December 2006	2006 Asian Games	Doha, Qatar	(Philippines) Heidi Illustre (Philippines) Diane Pascua	(China) Xue Chen (China) Zhang Xi	0-2 L (15-21, 18-21)
December 2006	2006 Asian Games	Doha, Qatar	(Philippines) Heidi Illustre (Philippines) Diane Pascua	(Sri Lanka) Geethika Gunawardena (Sri Lanka) Sujeewa Wijesinghe	2-0 W (21-12, 21-9)
December 2006	2006 Asian Games	Doha, Qatar	(Philippines) Heidi Illustre (Philippines) Diane Pascua	(Thailand) Yupa Phokongloy (Thailand) Usa Tenpaksee	0-2 L (20-22, 13-21)

=== 2009 ===
Date	Competition	Location	Representative	Opponent	Result
2009
December 2009	2009 Southeast Asian Games	Vientiane, Laos	(Philippines) Joanna Botor Carpio (Philippines) Michelle Carolino	(Malaysia) Beh Shun Ting (Malaysia) Luk Teck Hua	0-2 L (6-21, 19-21)
December 2009	2009 Southeast Asian Games	Vientiane, Laos	(Philippines) Joanna Botor Carpio (Philippines) Michelle Carolino	(Laos) Phimphone Boulapha (Laos) Vongphachanh Xayamonkhon	2-0 W (21-18, 23-21)
December 2009	2009 Southeast Asian Games	Vientiane, Laos	(Philippines) Joanna Botor Carpio (Philippines) Michelle Carolino	(Indonesia) Efa Sri Susilawati (Indonesia) Yokbeth Kapasiang	0-2 L (16-21, 17-21)
December 2009	2009 Southeast Asian Games	Vientiane, Laos	(Philippines) Joanna Botor Carpio (Philippines) Michelle Carolino	(Vietnam) Do Thi Hau (Vietnam) Ngo Vo Hong Loan	2-0 W (21-14, 23-14)
December 2009	2009 Southeast Asian Games	Vientiane, Laos	(Philippines) Joanna Botor Carpio (Philippines) Michelle Carolino	(Thailand) Usa Tenpaksee (Thailand) Jarunee Sannok	0-2 L (11-21, 7-21)
December 2009	2009 Southeast Asian Games	Vientiane, Laos	(Philippines) Joanna Botor Carpio (Philippines) Michelle Carolino	(Thailand) Yupa Phokongploy (Thailand) Kamoltip Kulna	0-2 L (18-21, 8-21)
December 2009	2009 Asian Beach Volleyball Championships	Haikou, China	(Philippines) Nerissa Bautista (Philippines) Jusabelle Brillo	(Thailand) Yupa Phokongploy (Thailand) Kamoltip Kulna	0-2 L (18-21, 8-21)
December 2009	2009 Asian Beach Volleyball Championships	Haikou, China	(Philippines) Nerissa Bautista (Philippines) Jusabelle Brillo	(China) Zhang Changning (China) Ji Linjun	0-2 L (14-21, 16-21)

=== 2010 ===
Date	Competition	Location	Representative	Opponent	Result
2010
October 2010	2010 Asian Beach Volleyball Championships	Haikou, China	(Philippines) Nerissa Bautista (Philippines) Jusabelle Brillo	(Chinese Taipei) Kou Nai-han (Chinese Taipei) Chang Hui-min	0-1 L (12-21)
October 2010	2010 Asian Beach Volleyball Championships	Haikou, China	(Philippines) Joanna Botor Carpio (Philippines) Nerissa Bautista	(Vietnam) Do Thi Hau (Vietnam) Ngo Vo Hong Loan	1-0 W (21-13)
October 2010	2010 Asian Beach Volleyball Championships	Haikou, China	(Philippines) Joanna Botor Carpio (Philippines) Michelle Carolino	(Vietnam) Truong Thi Yen (Vietnam) Nguyen Thi Mai	0-2 L (16-21, 15-21)

=== 2017 ===
Date	Competition	Location	Representative	Opponent	Result
2017
September 2017	2017 Southeast Asian Beach Volleyball Championships	Singapore, Singapore	(Philippines) Sisi Rondina (Philippines) Bernadeth Pons	(Thailand) Rumpaipruet Numwong (Thailand) Taravadee Naraphornrapat	1-2 L (21-15, 12-21, 5-15)
September 2017	2017 Southeast Asian Beach Volleyball Championships	Singapore, Singapore	(Philippines) Fiola Ceballos (Philippines) Patty Jane Orendain	(Singapore) Eliza Chong (Singapore) Gladys Lee	2-0 W (21-12, 21-10)
September 2017	2017 Southeast Asian Beach Volleyball Championships	Singapore, Singapore	(Philippines) Fiola Ceballos (Philippines) Patty Jane Orendain	(Timor-Leste) Leticia Febriana Alin de Sousa (Timor-Leste) Adilijia Caminha	2-0 W (21-11, 21-13)
September 2017	2017 Southeast Asian Beach Volleyball Championships	Singapore, Singapore	(Philippines) Sisi Rondina (Philippines) Bernadeth Pons	(Malaysia) Ming Yi Winnie Lim (Malaysia) Dawn Lynn	2-0 W (21-14, 21-5)
September 2017	2017 Southeast Asian Beach Volleyball Championships	Singapore, Singapore	(Philippines) Fiola Ceballos (Philippines) Patty Jane Orendain	(Vietnam) Thi Hoa Mai (Vietnam) Thi Cham Thi Tran	0-2 L (14-21, 20-22)
September 2017	2017 Southeast Asian Beach Volleyball Championships	Singapore, Singapore	(Philippines) Sisi Rondina (Philippines) Bernadeth Pons	(Indonesia) Dhita Juliana (Indonesia) Putu Dini Jasita Utami	0-2 L (11-21, 17-21)
September 2017	2017 Southeast Asian Beach Volleyball Championships	Singapore, Singapore	(Philippines) Fiola Ceballos (Philippines) Patty Jane Orendain	(Thailand) Rumpaipruet Numwong (Thailand) Taravadee Naraphornrapat	0-2 L (10-21, 9-21)

=== 2018 ===
Date	Competition	Location	Representative	Opponent	Result
2018
May 2018	FIVB World Tour - Manila Open	Manila, Philippines	(Philippines) Jackielyn Estoquia (Philippines) Dhannylaine Mae Demontaño	(Paraguay) Erika Sofia Bobadilla (Paraguay) Michelle Sharon Amarilla	0–2 L (19-21, 13-21)
May 2018	FIVB World Tour - Manila Open	Manila, Philippines	(Philippines) Jackielyn Estoquia (Philippines) Dhannylaine Mae Demontaño	(Germany) Leonie Klinke (Germany) Lisa-Sophie Kotzan	0–2 L (16-21, 12-21)
May 2018	FIVB World Tour - Manila Open	Manila, Philippines	(Philippines) Maria Rosario Soriano (Philippines) Ma. Beatriz Dominique Tan	(Japan) Takemi Nishibori (Japan) Ayumi Kosano	0–2 L (10-21, 9-21)
May 2018	FIVB World Tour - Manila Open	Manila, Philippines	(Philippines) Maria Rosario Soriano (Philippines) Ma. Beatriz Dominique Tan	(Canada) Megan Nagy (Canada) Caleigh Cruickshank	0–2 L (12-21, 15-21)
May 2018	FIVB World Tour - Manila Open	Manila, Philippines	(Philippines) Lourdilyn Catubag (Philippines) Karen Kay Quilario	(Netherlands) Katja Stam (Netherlands) Julia Wouters	0–2 L (14-21, 11-21)
May 2018	FIVB World Tour - Manila Open	Manila, Philippines	(Philippines) Lourdilyn Catubag (Philippines) Karen Kay Quilario	(Hong Kong) Ting Chi Yuen (Hong Kong) Wai Yan Au Yeung	2-1 W (21-13, 18-21, 15-11)
May 2018	FIVB World Tour - Manila Open	Manila, Philippines	(Philippines) Lourdilyn Catubag (Philippines) Karen Kay Quilario	(Thailand) Thatsarida Singchuea (Thailand) Pawarun Chanthawichai	1–2 L (36-34, 23-25, 15-17)
May 2018	FIVB World Tour - Manila Open	Manila, Philippines	(Philippines) Sisi Rondina (Philippines) Angeline Marie Gervacio	(United States) Lindsay Fuller (United States) Kaley Melville	2-1 W (21-12, 21-16)
May 2018	FIVB World Tour - Manila Open	Manila, Philippines	(Philippines) Sisi Rondina (Philippines) Angeline Marie Gervacio	(Spain) Paula Gutierrez (Spain) Maria Belen Carro De Acuña	0-2 L (20-22, 21-23)
May 2018	FIVB World Tour - Manila Open	Manila, Philippines	(Philippines) Sisi Rondina (Philippines) Angeline Marie Gervacio	(South Africa) Simone Sittig (South Africa) Luciana Pierangeli	2-1 W (21-12, 21-11)
May 2018	FIVB World Tour - Manila Open	Manila, Philippines	(Philippines) Sisi Rondina (Philippines) Angeline Marie Gervacio	(Canada) Megan Nagy (Canada) Caleigh Cruickshank	2-0 W (21-17, 21-17)
May 2018	FIVB World Tour - Manila Open	Manila, Philippines	(Philippines) Sisi Rondina (Philippines) Angeline Marie Gervacio	(Japan) Shinako Tanaka (Japan) Sakurako Fujii	1-2 L (13-21, 21-17, 11-15)

=== 2019 ===
Date	Competition	Location	Representative	Opponent	Result
2019
August to September 2019	FIVB World Tour - Boracay Open	Boracay, Philippines	(Philippines) Ma. Beatriz Dominique Tan (Philippines) Floremel Rodriguez	(Singapore) Eliza Chong (Singapore) Lau Shan	1–2 L (21-17, 13-21, 14-16)
August to September 2019	FIVB World Tour - Boracay Open	Boracay, Philippines	(Philippines) Jackielyn Estoquia (Philippines) Dhannylaine Mae Demontaño	(Australia) Brittany Kendall (Australia) Stefanie Weiler	0–2 L (18-21, 14-21)
August to September 2019	FIVB World Tour - Boracay Open	Boracay, Philippines	(Philippines) Sisi Rondina (Philippines) Bernadeth Pons	(Japan) Shinako Tanaka (Japan) Miyuki Matsumura	2-0 W (21-14, 21-8)
August to September 2019	FIVB World Tour - Boracay Open	Boracay, Philippines	(Philippines) Ma. Beatriz Dominique Tan (Philippines) Floremel Rodriguez	(Malaysia) Tan Hsi Yan (Malaysia) Tasha Mae	2-0 W (21-7, 21-15)
August to September 2019	FIVB World Tour - Boracay Open	Boracay, Philippines	(Philippines) Jackielyn Estoquia (Philippines) Dhannylaine Mae Demontaño	(Russia) Ekaterina Filina (Russia) Ekaterina Zazhigina	1–2 L (14-21, 21-19, 13-15)
August to September 2019	FIVB World Tour - Boracay Open	Boracay, Philippines	(Philippines) Sisi Rondina (Philippines) Bernadeth Pons	(Japan) Satono Ishitsubo (Japan) Asami Shiba	0-2 L (16-21, 19-21)
August to September 2019	FIVB World Tour - Boracay Open	Boracay, Philippines	(Philippines) Sisi Rondina (Philippines) Bernadeth Pons	(Russia) Ekaterina Filina (Russia) Ekaterina Zazhigina	2-0 W (21-18, 21-6)
August to September 2019	FIVB World Tour - Boracay Open	Boracay, Philippines	(Philippines) Ma. Beatriz Dominique Tan (Philippines) Floremel Rodriguez	(Thailand) Pawarun Chanthawichai (Thailand) Thatsarida Singchuea	0-2 L (12-21, 12-21)
August to September 2019	FIVB World Tour - Boracay Open	Boracay, Philippines	(Philippines) Sisi Rondina (Philippines) Bernadeth Pons	(Japan) Sakurako Fujii (Japan) Minori Kumada	0-2 L (17-21, 19-21)
November to December 2019	Southeast Asian Games	Subic, Philippines	(Philippines) Sisi Rondina (Philippines) Bernadeth Pons	(Indonesia) Putu Utami (Indonesia) Dhita Juliana	1–2 L (18-21, 21-16, 13-15)
November to December 2019	Southeast Asian Games	Subic, Philippines	(Philippines) Floremel Rodriguez (Philippines) Angeline Marie Gervacio	(Indonesia) Allysah Mutakharah (Indonesia) Desi Ratnasari	0–2 L (14-21, 16-21)
November to December 2019	Southeast Asian Games	Subic, Philippines	(Philippines) Sisi Rondina (Philippines) Bernadeth Pons	(Vietnam) Nguyen Thi Thanh Tram (Vietnam) Truong Duong My Huyen	2–1 W (21-8, 17-21, 15-7)
November to December 2019	Southeast Asian Games	Subic, Philippines	(Philippines) Floremel Rodriguez (Philippines) Angeline Marie Gervacio	(Vietnam) Vu Ngoc Lan Nguyen (Vietnam) Nguyen Le Thi Tuong Vy	0–2 L (14-21, 16-21)
November to December 2019	Southeast Asian Games	Subic, Philippines	(Philippines) Sisi Rondina (Philippines) Bernadeth Pons	(Vietnam) Vu Ngoc Lan Nguyen (Vietnam) Nguyen Le Thi Tuong Vy	2–0 W (22-20, 21-15)
November to December 2019	Southeast Asian Games	Subic, Philippines	(Philippines) Sisi Rondina (Philippines) Bernadeth Pons	(Malaysia) Tan Hsi Yan (Malaysia) Mae Tasha	2–0 W (21-13, 21-9)
November to December 2019	Southeast Asian Games	Subic, Philippines	(Philippines) Floremel Rodriguez (Philippines) Angeline Marie Gervacio	(Malaysia) Foo Sin Xi (Malaysia) Joo Shu Woon	2–1 W (17-21, 21-13, 15-7
November to December 2019	Southeast Asian Games	Subic, Philippines	(Philippines) Sisi Rondina (Philippines) Bernadeth Pons	(Thailand) Varapatsorn Radarong (Thailand) Khanittha Hongpak	0–2 L (24-16, 15-21)
November to December 2019	Southeast Asian Games	Subic, Philippines	(Philippines) Floremel Rodriguez (Philippines) Angeline Marie Gervacio	(Thailand) Tanarattha Udomchavee (Thailand) Rumpaipruet Numwong	0–2 L (16-21, 14-21)
November to December 2019	Southeast Asian Games	Subic, Philippines	(Philippines) Sisi Rondina (Philippines) Bernadeth Pons	(Singapore) Lau Ee Shan (Singapore) Serene Ng	2–0 W (21-17, 21-13)
November to December 2019	Southeast Asian Games	Subic, Philippines	(Philippines) Floremel Rodriguez (Philippines) Angeline Marie Gervacio	(Singapore) Eliza Hui Hui Chong (Singapore) Gladys Lee	2–0 W (21-18, 21-16)

=== 2021 ===
Date	Competition	Location	Representative	Opponent	Result
2021
June 2021	AVC Beach Volleyball Continental Cup	Nakhon Pathom, Thailand	(Philippines) Sisi Rondina (Philippines) Bernadeth Pons	(New Zealand) Francesca Kirwan (New Zealand) Olivia MacDonald	2-1 W (21-12, 17-21, 15-9)
June 2021	AVC Beach Volleyball Continental Cup	Nakhon Pathom, Thailand	(Philippines) Floremel Rodriguez (Philippines) Baby Love Barbon	(New Zealand) Alice Zeimann (New Zealand) Shaunna Marie Polley	0-2 L (14-21, 13-21)
June 2021	AVC Beach Volleyball Continental Cup	Nakhon Pathom, Thailand	(Philippines) Sisi Rondina (Philippines) Bernadeth Pons	(New Zealand) Alice Zeimann (New Zealand) Shaunna Marie Polley	1-2 L (21-19, 10-21, 12-15)
November 2021	2021 Asian Beach Volleyball Championships	Phuket, Thailand	(Philippines) Floremel Rodriguez (Philippines) Genesa Jane Eslapor	(Australia) Phoebe Bell (Australia) Georgia Johnson	1-2 L (22–20, 10–21, 11-15)
November 2021	2021 Asian Beach Volleyball Championships	Phuket, Thailand	(Philippines) Floremel Rodriguez (Philippines) Genesa Jane Eslapor	Varapatsorn Radarong; Tanarattha Udomchavee	0-2 L (16–21, 22–24)
November 2021	2021 Asian Beach Volleyball Championships	Phuket, Thailand	(Philippines) Floremel Rodriguez (Philippines) Genesa Jane Eslapor	(Sri Lanka) Deepika Bandara (Sri Lanka) Hashini Malsha	2-0 W (22-20, 21-12)
November 2021	2021 Asian Beach Volleyball Championships	Phuket, Thailand	(Philippines) Sisi Rondina (Philippines) Bernadeth Pons	(Japan) Asami Shiba (Japan) Takemi Nishibori	1-2 L (21–13, 20–22, 12-15)
November 2021	2021 Asian Beach Volleyball Championships	Phuket, Thailand	(Philippines) Sisi Rondina (Philippines) Bernadeth Pons	Taravadee Naraphornrapat; Worapeerachayakorn Kongphopsarutawadee	0-2 L (9–21, 14–21)
November 2021	2021 Asian Beach Volleyball Championships	Phuket, Thailand	(Philippines) Sisi Rondina (Philippines) Bernadeth Pons	(Australia) Alisha Stevens (Australia) Jana Milutinovic	2-0 W (21-15, 24-22)
November 2021	2021 Asian Beach Volleyball Championships	Phuket, Thailand	(Philippines) Floremel Rodriguez (Philippines) Genesa Jane Eslapor	(Australia) Jasmine Fleming (Australia) Stefanie Fejes	0-2 L (17–21, 14–21)
November 2021	2021 Asian Beach Volleyball Championships	Phuket, Thailand	(Philippines) Sisi Rondina (Philippines) Bernadeth Pons	(Japan) Akiko Hasegawa (Japan) Yurika Sakaguchi	0-2 L (17–21, 15–21)

=== 2022 ===
Date	Competition	Location	Representative	Opponent	Result
2022
May 2022	2021 Southeast Asian Games	Hanoi, Vietnam	(Philippines) Sisi Rondina (Philippines) Bernadeth Pons	(Singapore) Tan Kai Yun Alicia (Singapore) Soh Hui Chin Cecilia	2-0 W (21-14, 21-9)
May 2022	2021 Southeast Asian Games	Hanoi, Vietnam	(Philippines) Jovelyn Gonzaga (Philippines) Floremel Rodriguez	(Singapore) Eliza Chong (Singapore) Ong Wei Yu	2-0 W (21-12, 21-8)
May 2022	2021 Southeast Asian Games	Hanoi, Vietnam	(Philippines) Sisi Rondina (Philippines) Bernadeth Pons	(Malaysia) Aina Ahmad Nizar Farwizah (Malaysia) Jia Yin Beh Maegan	2-0 W (21-11, 21-9)
May 2022	2021 Southeast Asian Games	Hanoi, Vietnam	(Philippines) Jovelyn Gonzaga (Philippines) Floremel Rodriguez	(Malaysia) Foo Sin Xi (Malaysia) Yee Sin Sing	2-0 W (21-14, 21-9)
May 2022	2021 Southeast Asian Games	Hanoi, Vietnam	(Philippines) Sisi Rondina (Philippines) Bernadeth Pons	(Indonesia) Dhita Juliana (Indonesia) Putu Dini Jasita Utami	0-2 L (19-21, 17-21)
May 2022	2021 Southeast Asian Games	Hanoi, Vietnam	(Philippines) Jovelyn Gonzaga (Philippines) Floremel Rodriguez	(Indonesia) Nur Sari (Indonesia) Sari Hartati	2-0 W (21-13, 21-19)
May 2022	2021 Southeast Asian Games	Hanoi, Vietnam	(Philippines) Sisi Rondina (Philippines) Bernadeth Pons	(Indonesia) Dhita Juliana (Indonesia) Putu Dini Jasita Utami	0-2 L (15-21, 19-21)
May 2022	2021 Southeast Asian Games	Hanoi, Vietnam	(Philippines) Sisi Rondina (Philippines) Bernadeth Pons	(Vietnam) Nguyen Thi Thanh Tram (Vietnam) Truong Duong My Huyen	2-0 W (21-16, 21-12)
May 2022	2021 Southeast Asian Games	Hanoi, Vietnam	(Philippines) Jovelyn Gonzaga (Philippines) Floremel Rodriguez	(Vietnam) Truong Duong Thai My Huyen (Vietnam) Nguyen Thi Thanh Tram	2-0 W (21-13, 22-20)
May 2022	2021 Southeast Asian Games	Hanoi, Vietnam	(Philippines) Sisi Rondina (Philippines) Bernadeth Pons	(Thailand) Taravadee Naraphornrapat (Thailand) Worapeerachayakorn Kongphopsarutawadee	0-2 L (20-22, 15-21)
May 2022	2021 Southeast Asian Games	Hanoi, Vietnam	(Philippines) Jovelyn Gonzaga (Philippines) Floremel Rodriguez	(Thailand) Varapatsorn Radarong (Thailand) Tanarattha Udomchavee	0-2 L (18-21, 15-21)
May 2022	2021 Southeast Asian Games	Hanoi, Vietnam	(Philippines) Sisi Rondina (Philippines) Bernadeth Pons	(Vietnam) Nguyen Thi Thanh Tram (Vietnam) Truong Duong My Huyen	2-1 W (20-22, 21-18, 15-12)
May 2022	2021 Southeast Asian Games	Hanoi, Vietnam	(Philippines) Jovelyn Gonzaga (Philippines) Floremel Rodriguez	(Vietnam) Truong Duong Thai My Huyen (Vietnam) Nguyen Thi Thanh Tram	2-0 W (21-17, 21-16)
