= Beach volleyball at the 2009 Asian Youth Games =

Asian Youth Games

- Venue: Siloso Beach
- Dates: 1–5 July 2009

The Beach volleyball competition in the 2009 Asian Youth Games were held at Siloso Beach, Sentosa in Singapore between 1 and 5 July 2009.

== Medalists ==
Event	Gold	Silver	Bronze
Boys	Thailand; Thosapol Puangprasert; Warut Prasanok	Kazakhstan; Vladislav Pustynnikov; Sergey Bogatu	Indonesia; Gede Eka Agustiawan; Ade Candra Rachmawan
Girls	Thailand; Aunchalee Yansuwan; Prateep Kambut	Kazakhstan; Bakhtygul Samalikova; Lyubov Bogatu	China; Chen Chunxia; Lu Yuanyuan

== Medal table ==
Rank	Nation	Gold	Silver	Bronze	Total
1	Thailand (THA)	2	0	0	2
2	Kazakhstan (KAZ)	0	2	0	2
3	China (CHN)	0	0	1	1
3	Indonesia (INA)	0	0	1	1
Totals (4 entries)		2	2	2	6

== Results ==
=== Boys ===
==== Preliminary round ====
===== Group A =====
Pos	Team	Pld	W	L	Pts	SPW	SPL	SPR	SW	SL	SR
1	Omair–Haidarah (YEM)	3	3	0	6	136	104	1.308	6	1	6.000
2	Chandran–Ravi (IND)	3	2	1	5	132	119	1.109	4	3	1.333
3	Al-Salehi–Al-Shezawi (OMA)	3	1	2	4	110	118	0.932	3	4	0.750
4	Naranbayar–Myagmarsüren (MGL)	3	0	3	3	106	143	0.741	1	6	0.167

Source: AVC

Date		Score		Set 1	Set 2	Set 3
01 Jul	Chandran–Ravi (IND)	0–2	Omair–Haidarah (YEM)	18–21	13–21	
01 Jul	Al-Salehi–Al-Shezawi (OMA)	2–0	Naranbayar–Myagmarsüren (MGL)	21–11	21–13	
01 Jul	Naranbayar–Myagmarsüren (MGL)	1–2	Chandran–Ravi (IND)	21–19	11–21	17–19
02 Jul	Omair–Haidarah (YEM)	2–1	Al-Salehi–Al-Shezawi (OMA)	21–9	16–21	15–10
02 Jul	Chandran–Ravi (IND)	2–0	Al-Salehi–Al-Shezawi (OMA)	21–12	21–16	
02 Jul	Naranbayar–Myagmarsüren (MGL)	0–2	Omair–Haidarah (YEM)	16–21	17–21	

===== Group B =====
Pos	Team	Pld	W	L	Pts	SPW	SPL	SPR	SW	SL	SR
1	Fernando–Fernando (SRI)	3	3	0	6	126	89	1.416	6	0	MAX
2	Goh–Qing (SIN)	3	2	1	5	124	125	0.992	4	3	1.333
3	Al-Zayer–Ghazwani (KSA)	3	1	2	4	125	125	1.000	3	4	0.750
4	Koizumi–Nishigaki (JPN)	3	0	3	3	90	126	0.714	0	6	0.000

Source: AVC

Date		Score		Set 1	Set 2	Set 3
01 Jul	Goh–Qing (SIN)	0–2	Fernando–Fernando (SRI)	17–21	14–21	
01 Jul	Al-Zayer–Ghazwani (KSA)	2–0	Koizumi–Nishigaki (JPN)	21–17	21–15	
01 Jul	Koizumi–Nishigaki (JPN)	0–2	Goh–Qing (SIN)	17–21	15–21	
02 Jul	Fernando–Fernando (SRI)	2–0	Al-Zayer–Ghazwani (KSA)	21–14	21–18	
02 Jul	Goh–Qing (SIN)	2–1	Al-Zayer–Ghazwani (KSA)	21–18	15–21	15–12
02 Jul	Koizumi–Nishigaki (JPN)	0–2	Fernando–Fernando (SRI)	13–21	13–21	

===== Group C =====
Pos	Team	Pld	W	L	Pts	SPW	SPL	SPR	SW	SL	SR
1	Puangprasert–Prasanok (THA)	3	3	0	6	128	76	1.684	6	0	MAX
2	Chen–Juan (TPE)	3	2	1	5	129	108	1.194	4	3	1.333
3	Hammad–Sultan (BRN)	3	1	2	4	122	119	1.025	3	4	0.750
4	Mohammed–Hussain (QAT)	3	0	3	3	50	126	0.397	0	6	0.000

Source: AVC

Date		Score		Set 1	Set 2	Set 3
01 Jul	Chen–Juan (TPE)	0–2	Puangprasert–Prasanok (THA)	17–21	15–21	
01 Jul	Mohammed–Hussain (QAT)	0–2	Hammad–Sultan (BRN)	8–21	12–21	
01 Jul	Hammad–Sultan (BRN)	1–2	Chen–Juan (TPE)	14–21	21–19	13–15
02 Jul	Puangprasert–Prasanok (THA)	2–0	Mohammed–Hussain (QAT)	21–5	21–7	
02 Jul	Chen–Juan (TPE)	2–0	Mohammed–Hussain (QAT)	21–10	21–8	
02 Jul	Hammad–Sultan (BRN)	0–2	Puangprasert–Prasanok (THA)	21–23	11–21	

===== Group D =====
Pos	Team	Pld	W	L	Pts	SPW	SPL	SPR	SW	SL	SR
1	Agustiawan–Rachmawan (INA)	2	2	0	4	84	65	1.292	4	0	MAX
2	Pustynnikov–Bogatu (KAZ)	2	1	1	3	90	89	1.011	2	3	0.667
3	Hu–Ru (CHN)	2	0	2	2	78	98	0.796	1	4	0.250

Source: AVC

Date		Score		Set 1	Set 2	Set 3
01 Jul	Pustynnikov–Bogatu (KAZ)	0–2	Agustiawan–Rachmawan (INA)	15–21	19–21	
01 Jul	Agustiawan–Rachmawan (INA)	2–0	Hu–Ru (CHN)	21–13	21–18	
02 Jul	Hu–Ru (CHN)	1–2	Pustynnikov–Bogatu (KAZ)	12–21	22–20	13–15

==== Knockout round ====
Elimination round 1; 3 July
Chandran–Ravi (IND)	17	25
Hammad–Sultan (BRN)	21	27
Goh–Qing (SIN)	22	19	6
Al-Salehi–Al-Shezawi (OMA)	20	21	15
Puangprasert–Prasanok (THA)	21	21
Naranbayar–Myagmarsüren (MGL)	19	8
Chen–Juan (TPE)	21	21
Hu–Ru (CHN)	18	12
Omair–Haidarah (YEM)	21	21
Koizumi–Nishigaki (JPN)	11	12
Pustynnikov–Bogatu (KAZ)	21	21
Al-Zayer–Ghazwani (KSA)	15	17
Fernando–Fernando (SRI)	21	21
Mohammed–Hussain (QAT)	5	8

Quarterfinals; 4 July
Agustiawan–Rachmawan (INA)	21	23
Hammad–Sultan (BRN)	16	21
Al-Salehi–Al-Shezawi (OMA)	16	12
Puangprasert–Prasanok (THA)	21	21
Chen–Juan (TPE)	21	16	10
Omair–Haidarah (YEM)	19	21	15
Pustynnikov–Bogatu (KAZ)	21	25
Fernando–Fernando (SRI)	17	23

Semifinals; 4 July
Agustiawan–Rachmawan (INA)	15	21	11
Puangprasert–Prasanok (THA)	21	17	15
Omair–Haidarah (YEM)	13	25	11
Pustynnikov–Bogatu (KAZ)	21	23	15

Gold final 5 July
Puangprasert–Prasanok (THA)	21	21
Pustynnikov–Bogatu (KAZ)	19	10
Bronze final
Agustiawan–Rachmawan (INA)	21	21
Omair–Haidarah (YEM)	16	17

=== Girls ===
==== Preliminary round ====
===== Group E =====
Pos	Team	Pld	W	L	Pts	SPW	SPL	SPR	SW	SL	SR
1	Suzuki–Yamamoto (JPN)	2	2	0	4	98	74	1.324	4	1	4.000
2	Yansuwan–Kambut (THA)	2	1	1	3	92	67	1.373	3	2	1.500
3	Varadharajan–Kanagasalam (IND)	2	0	2	2	35	84	0.417	0	4	0.000

Source: AVC

Date		Score		Set 1	Set 2	Set 3
01 Jul	Suzuki–Yamamoto (JPN)	2–1	Yansuwan–Kambut (THA)	20–22	21–18	15–10
01 Jul	Yansuwan–Kambut (THA)	2–0	Varadharajan–Kanagasalam (IND)	21–3	21–8	
02 Jul	Varadharajan–Kanagasalam (IND)	0–2	Suzuki–Yamamoto (JPN)	9–21	15–21	

===== Group F =====
Pos	Team	Pld	W	L	Pts	SPW	SPL	SPR	SW	SL	SR
1	Samalikova–Bogatu (KAZ)	2	2	0	4	95	75	1.267	4	1	4.000
2	Chen–Lu (CHN)	2	1	1	3	90	73	1.233	3	2	1.500
3	Elvina–Juliana (INA)	2	0	2	2	47	84	0.560	0	4	0.000

Source: AVC

Date		Score		Set 1	Set 2	Set 3
01 Jul	Samalikova–Bogatu (KAZ)	2–0	Elvina–Juliana (INA)	21–13	21–14	
01 Jul	Elvina–Juliana (INA)	0–2	Chen–Lu (CHN)	9–21	11–21	
02 Jul	Chen–Lu (CHN)	1–2	Samalikova–Bogatu (KAZ)	21–15	17–21	15–12

===== Group G =====
Pos	Team	Pld	W	L	Pts	SPW	SPL	SPR	SW	SL	SR
1	Azizova–Kozlova (KGZ)	2	2	0	4	84	45	1.867	4	0	MAX
2	Peng–Tan (SIN)	2	1	1	3	70	62	1.129	2	2	1.000
3	Namuun–Nominzul (MGL)	2	0	2	2	37	84	0.440	0	4	0.000

Source: AVC

Date		Score		Set 1	Set 2	Set 3
01 Jul	Peng–Tan (SIN)	2–0	Namuun–Nominzul (MGL)	21–13	21–7	
01 Jul	Namuun–Nominzul (MGL)	0–2	Azizova–Kozlova (KGZ)	10–21	7–21	
02 Jul	Azizova–Kozlova (KGZ)	2–0	Peng–Tan (SIN)	21–13	21–15	

===== Group H =====
Pos	Team	Pld	W	L	Pts	SPW	SPL	SPR	SW	SL	SR
1	Chen–Tsai (TPE)	2	2	0	4	89	81	1.099	4	1	4.000
2	Fajardo–Valdez (PHI)	2	1	1	3	91	79	1.152	3	2	1.500
3	Illangakoon–Sanjeewani (SRI)	2	0	2	2	64	84	0.762	0	4	0.000

Source: AVC

Date		Score		Set 1	Set 2	Set 3
01 Jul	Fajardo–Valdez (PHI)	2–0	Illangakoon–Sanjeewani (SRI)	21–15	21–17	
01 Jul	Illangakoon–Sanjeewani (SRI)	0–2	Chen–Tsai (TPE)	14–21	18–21	
02 Jul	Chen–Tsai (TPE)	2–1	Fajardo–Valdez (PHI)	21–18	11–21	15–10

==== Knockout round ====
Elimination round 1; 2 July
Peng–Tan (SIN)	11	11
Elvina–Juliana (INA)	21	21
Fajardo–Valdez (PHI)	21	21
Namuun–Nominzul (MGL)	16	16
Chen–Lu (CHN)	21	21
Varadharajan–Kanagasalam (IND)	8	12
Yansuwan–Kambut (THA)	21	21
Illangakoon–Sanjeewani (SRI)	4	5

Quarterfinals; 3 July
Azizova–Kozlova (KGZ)	13	9
Elvina–Juliana (INA)	21	21
Fajardo–Valdez (PHI)	11	18
Samalikova–Bogatu (KAZ)	21	21
Chen–Lu (CHN)	21	21
Chen–Tsai (TPE)	15	14
Yansuwan–Kambut (THA)	21	25
Suzuki–Yamamoto (JPN)	10	14

Semifinals; 4 July
Elvina–Juliana (INA)	18	16
Samalikova–Bogatu (KAZ)	21	21
Chen–Lu (CHN)	21	17	12
Yansuwan–Kambut (THA)	17	21	15

Gold final 5 July
Samalikova–Bogatu (KAZ)	14	12
Yansuwan–Kambut (THA)	21	21
Bronze final
Elvina–Juliana (INA)	7	18
Chen–Lu (CHN)	21	21
