= Chunxia =

Chunxia is a Chinese female given name. It may refer to:

- Qi Chunxia, Chinese sport shooter
- Li Chunxia, Chinese softball player
- Chen Chunxia, Chinese volleyball player
- Shi Chunxia, Chinese snooker player

== See also ==
- Jessie Li, also known as Chun Xia, Chinese actress
