= Bob O'Dea =

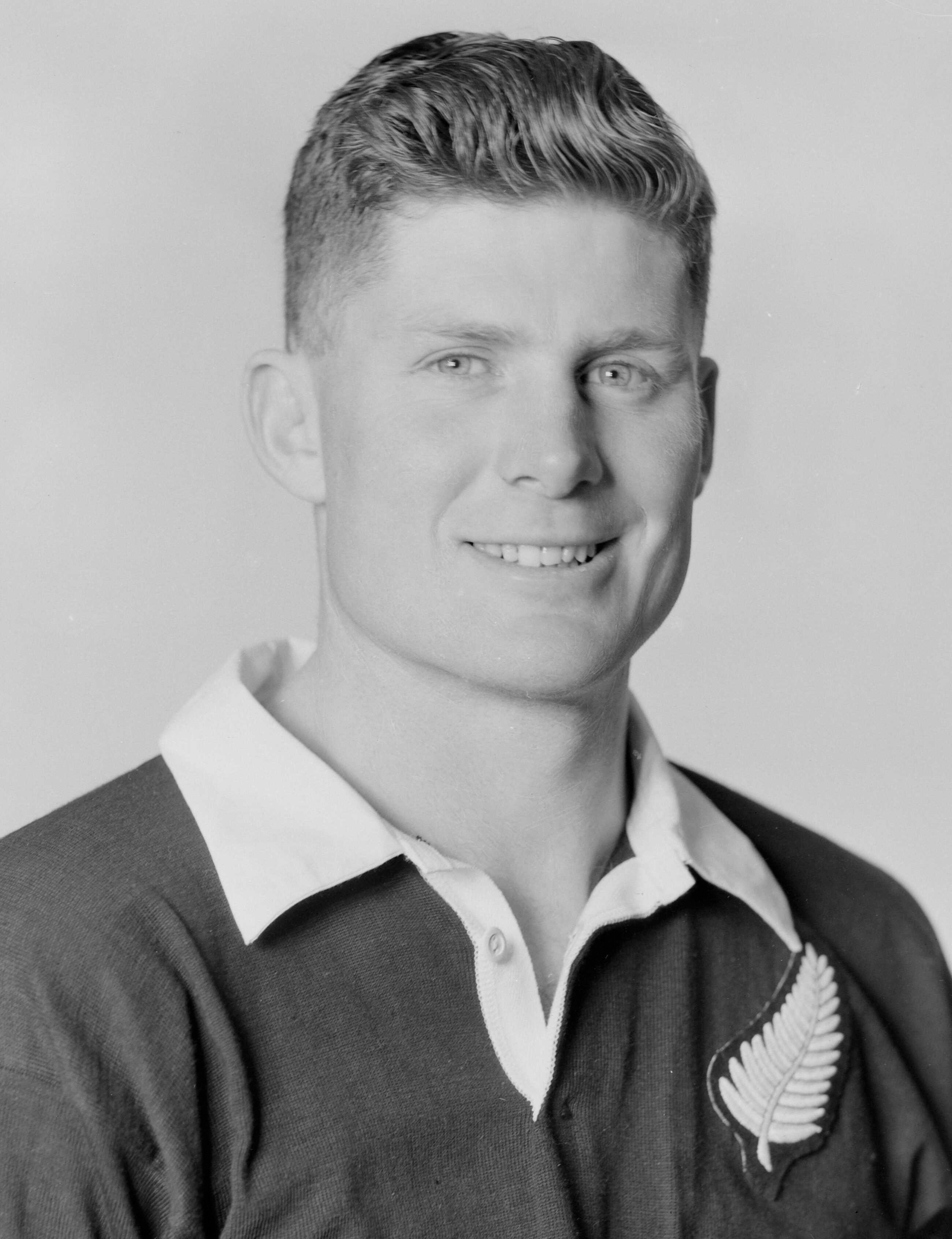
- O'Dea in 1953
- Born: Robert John O'Dea; 27 January 1930 Gisborne, New Zealand
- Died: 16 July 1986 (aged 56) Te Puna, New Zealand
- Height: 1.91 m (6 ft 3 in)
- Weight: 93 kg (205 lb)
- School: Morrinsville District High School
- Notable relative(s): Ben O'Dea (grandson); Sam O'Dea (grandson) Edwin O'Dea (grandson)
- Occupation: Farmer

Rugby union career
- Position: Flanker
Provincial / State sides
Years	Team	Apps	(Points)
1951–55	Thames Valley	30	
International career
Years	Team	Apps	(Points)
1953–54	New Zealand	0	(0)

Robert John O'Dea (27 January 1930 – 16 July 1986) was a New Zealand rugby union player. A flanker, O'Dea represented Thames Valley at a provincial level, and was a member of the New Zealand national side, the All Blacks, on their 1953–54 tour of Britain, Ireland, France and North America. He played five matches on that tour but did not appear in any internationals.

O'Dea's grandsons, Edwin, Ben and Sam O'Dea, are noted beach volleyball players.
