= Volleyball at the 2013 Islamic Solidarity Games =

- Venue: PSCC Competition Hall
- Dates: 23 – 30 September 2013

Volleyball at the 2013 Islamic Solidarity Games is held in PSCC Competition Hall, Palembang, Indonesia from 23 to 30 September 2013.

== Medalists ==
=== Beach ===
Event	Gold	Silver	Bronze
Men	Oman; Badar Al-Subhi; Hassan Al-Balushi	Indonesia; Koko Prasetyo Darkuncoro; Ade Candra Rachmawan	Oman; Ahmed Al-Housni; Haitham Al-Shereiqi
Women	Indonesia; Dhita Juliana; Putu Dini Jasita Utami	Indonesia; Nanda Ragillia; Riski Dwi Andriani	Malaysia; Kuck Sea Theng; Luk Teck Hua

=== Indoor ===
Event	Gold	Silver	Bronze
Men	Iran; Behzad Heidari; Hossein Hassanpour; Mohammad Hassan Senobar; Mostafa Sharifat; Mohammad Reza Hosseini; Mojtaba Gholizad; Ali Sajjadi; Mojtaba Yousefi; Alireza Jalali; Reza Safaei; Farhad Piroutpour; Mohammad Taher Vadi	Egypt; Ahmed El-Sayed; Hisham Ewais; Mohamed Thakil; Mohamed Hassan; Mohamed El-Nagar; Islam El-Sayed; Nabil El-Hanafy; Mohamed Khattab; Sherif Aly; Mohamed Masoud; Ahmed Shafik; Mostafa Abdelrahman	Turkey; Berkan Bozan; Emincan Kocabaş; Burak Baturalp Güngör; Emre Şenol; Ediz Kaan Fırıncıoğlu; Fatih Cihan; Murat Tokgöz; Emre Vahit Savaş; Yiğit Gülmezoğlu; Melih Sıratca; Yasin Aydın; Cansın Ogbai Enaboifo

== Medal table ==
Rank	Nation	Gold	Silver	Bronze	Total
1	Indonesia (INA)	1	2	0	3
2	Oman (OMA)	1	0	1	2
3	Iran (IRI)	1	0	0	1
4	Egypt (EGY)	0	1	0	1
5	Malaysia (MAS)	0	0	1	1
5	Turkey (TUR)	0	0	1	1
Totals (6 entries)		3	3	3	9

== Results ==
=== Preliminary round ===
==== Group A ====
Pos	Team	Pld	W	L	Pts	SW	SL	SR	SPW	SPL	SPR	Qualification
1	Iran	4	4	0	12	12	1	12.000	325	218	1.491	Semifinals
2	Turkey	4	2	2	6	8	6	1.333	324	312	1.038	Semifinals
3	Cameroon	4	2	2	6	7	8	0.875	324	334	0.970	
4	Qatar	4	2	2	6	6	7	0.857	279	294	0.949	
5	Kuwait	4	0	4	0	1	12	0.083	220	314	0.701	

Date	Time		Score		Set 1	Set 2	Set 3	Set 4	Set 5	Total	Report
23 Sep	14:00	Iran	3–0	Kuwait	25–10	25–12	25–14			75–36	Report
23 Sep	16:00	Qatar	3–1	Cameroon	26–24	19–25	25–18	25–23		95–90	Report
24 Sep	14:00	Turkey	1–3	Cameroon	25–19	22–25	24–26	23–25		94–95	Report
24 Sep	18:00	Iran	3–0	Qatar	25–17	25–17	25–18			75–52	Report
25 Sep	14:00	Kuwait	0–3	Qatar	21–25	14–25	19–25			54–75	Report
25 Sep	16:00	Turkey	1–3	Iran	27–25	20–25	16–25	17–25		80–100	Report
26 Sep	14:00	Kuwait	0–3	Turkey	16–25	23–25	21–25			60–75	Report
26 Sep	18:00	Cameroon	0–3	Iran	17–25	16–25	17–25			50–75	Report
28 Sep	14:00	Qatar	0–3	Turkey	18–25	22–25	17–25			57–75	Report
28 Sep	16:00	Cameroon	3–1	Kuwait	14–25	25–16	25–13	25–16		89–70	Report

==== Group B ====
Pos	Team	Pld	W	L	Pts	SW	SL	SR	SPW	SPL	SPR	Qualification
1	Egypt	3	3	0	9	9	1	9.000	248	194	1.278	Semifinals
2	Indonesia	3	2	1	6	7	4	1.750	249	228	1.092	Semifinals
3	Turkmenistan	3	1	2	3	4	6	0.667	217	218	0.995	
4	Saudi Arabia	3	0	3	0	0	9	0.000	151	225	0.671	

Date	Time		Score		Set 1	Set 2	Set 3	Set 4	Set 5	Total	Report
23 Sep	18:00	Indonesia	3–0	Saudi Arabia	25–17	25–18	25–15			75–50	Report
24 Sep	16:00	Egypt	3–0	Turkmenistan	25–21	25–22	25–19			75–62	Report
25 Sep	12:00	Saudi Arabia	0–3	Turkmenistan	13–25	22–25	14–25			49–75	Report
25 Sep	18:00	Indonesia	1–3	Egypt	17–25	21–25	25–23	17–25		80–98	Report
26 Sep	16:00	Egypt	3–0	Saudi Arabia	25–18	25–17	25–17			75–52	Report
28 Sep	18:00	Indonesia	3–1	Turkmenistan	25–16	25–20	19–25	25–19		94–80	Report

=== Final round ===
Semifinals
29 September
Iran	3
Indonesia	0
29 September
Egypt	3
Turkey	0

Final
30 September
Iran	3
Egypt	1
3rd place
30 September
Indonesia	2
Turkey	3

==== Semifinals ====
Date	Time		Score		Set 1	Set 2	Set 3	Set 4	Set 5	Total	Report
29 Sep	16:00	Iran	3–0	Indonesia	25–19	25–17	25–17			75–53	Report
29 Sep	18:00	Egypt	3–0	Turkey	25–23	25–23	25–16			75–62	Report

==== 3rd place ====
Date	Time		Score		Set 1	Set 2	Set 3	Set 4	Set 5	Total	Report
30 Sep	16:00	Turkey	3–2	Indonesia	25–13	23–25	22–25	25–21	15–10	110–94	Report

==== Final ====
Date	Time		Score		Set 1	Set 2	Set 3	Set 4	Set 5	Total	Report
30 Sep	18:00	Iran	3–1	Egypt	30–28	25–27	25–20	25–16		105–91	Report
