= Bowling at the 2009 Asian Youth Games =

- Venue: Orchid Country Club
- Dates: 1–6 July 2009

The Bowling competition in the 2009 Asian Youth Games was held in the Orchid Country Club in Singapore between 1 and 6 July 2009.

== Medalists ==
=== Boys ===
Event	Gold	Silver	Bronze
Singles	Michael Mak; Hong Kong	Park Ji-soo; South Korea	Hwang Dong-jun; South Korea
Doubles	South Korea; Choi Kyung-hwan; Hwang Dong-jun	Japan; Satoshi Hamanaka; Takuma Echigo	Singapore; Brandon Lee; Christopher Hwang
Team of 4	Hong Kong; Wong Kwan Yuen; Tsang Yin Ki; Tse Chung Yin; Michael Mak	Singapore; Basil Low; Brandon Lee; Christopher Hwang; Justin Lim	South Korea; Choi Kyung-hwan; Hwang Dong-jun; Nam Ki-hoon; Park Ji-soo
Masters	Basil Low; Singapore	Choi Kyung-hwan; South Korea	Collins Jose; Philippines

=== Girls ===
Event	Gold	Silver	Bronze
Singles	New Hui Fen; Singapore	Misaki Mukotani; Japan	Oh Nu-ri; South Korea
Doubles	Singapore; Darshini Krishna; New Hui Fen	Thailand; Tanaprang Sathean; Yanee Saebe	South Korea; Sim Ui-jin; Oh Nu-ri
Team of 4	South Korea; Oh Nu-ri; Yoo Ka-hee; Hong Hae-ni; Sim Ui-jin	Singapore; Darshini Krishna; Anthea Soh; Ilma Nur Jannah; New Hui Fen	Japan; Yuka Oshima; Mikie Hamamoto; Shinobu Saito; Misaki Mukotani
Masters	Sim Ui-jin; South Korea	New Hui Fen; Singapore	Darshini Krishna; Singapore

== Medal table ==
Rank	Nation	Gold	Silver	Bronze	Total
1	Singapore (SIN)	3	3	2	8
2	South Korea (KOR)	3	2	4	9
3	Hong Kong (HKG)	2	0	0	2
4	Japan (JPN)	0	2	1	3
5	Thailand (THA)	0	1	0	1
6	Philippines (PHI)	0	0	1	1
Totals (6 entries)		8	8	8	24

== Results ==
=== Boys ===
==== Singles ====
1 July

Rank	Athlete	Score
1st place, gold medalist(s)	Michael Mak (HKG)	1396
2nd place, silver medalist(s)	Park Ji-soo (KOR)	1381
3rd place, bronze medalist(s)	Hwang Dong-jun (KOR)	1345
4	Phumin Klanbida (THA)	1332
5	Choi Kyung-hwan (KOR)	1324
6	Takuma Echigo (JPN)	1314
7	Satoshi Hamanaka (JPN)	1295
8	Justin Lim (SIN)	1293
9	Collins Jose (PHI)	1291
10	Tsang Yin Ki (HKG)	1289
11	Chen Kuan-yeh (TPE)	1260
12	Louie Chuaquico (PHI)	1259
13	Tse Chung Yin (HKG)	1246
14	Dechochai Tinjiratip (THA)	1240
15	Basil Low (SIN)	1233
16	Peerawich Rungcharoen (THA)	1230
17	Hiroki Takada (JPN)	1220
18	Faisal Sugati (KSA)	1217
19	Jayson Tubid (PHI)	1206
20	Dennis Ranova (INA)	1205
21	Chang Cheng (TPE)	1198
22	Christopher Hwang (SIN)	1191
22	Adhiguna Widiantoro (INA)	1191
24	Fachri Ibnu Askar (INA)	1190
25	Brandon Lee (SIN)	1189
26	Yusuke Yamamoto (JPN)	1187
27	Ahmed Al-Goud (BRN)	1174
28	Nam Ki-hoon (KOR)	1155
29	Abdullah Ahmad (KUW)	1151
30	Husain Ebrahim (BRN)	1147
31	Khalid Al-Hamdan (KSA)	1142
32	Lao U Hin (MAC)	1137
32	Mohammad Al-Wazzan (KUW)	1137
34	Zhang Kai (CHN)	1128
35	Sultan Al-Qubaisi (UAE)	1124
36	Qusi Ahmed (KSA)	1123
37	Zoe Dias Ma (MAC)	1115
38	Yue Lian (CHN)	1114
39	Taha Ebrahim Selail (BRN)	1112
40	Mohammad Salem (KUW)	1098
41	Yang Shih-hsien (TPE)	1090
42	Shane Riedel (MAC)	1079
42	Cai Xiaotian (CHN)	1079
44	Cheng Hsing-yueh (TPE)	1077
45	Wong Kwan Yuen (HKG)	1075
46	Phạm Gia Phú (VIE)	1069
47	Mohammad Iqbal (INA)	1066
48	Zhou Jiayang (CHN)	1064
49	Matar Al-Mansoory (UAE)	1059
50	Mohannad Ebrahim (KUW)	1057
51	Abdulla Al-Mulla (UAE)	1040
52	Nuttapol Kophatthanachaicharoen (THA)	1034
53	Saeed Al-Ameri (UAE)	1018
54	Bryan Gabay (PHI)	1014
55	Raed Abdulla (BRN)	1013
56	Abdulrahman Al-Aslani (KSA)	942
57	Khasan Samoylov (UZB)	820
58	La Minh Hoàng (VIE)	744
59	Rustam Babaliev (UZB)	610

==== Doubles ====
2 July

Rank	Team	Score
1st place, gold medalist(s)	South Korea (KOR); Choi Kyung-hwan; Hwang Dong-jun	2711
2nd place, silver medalist(s)	Japan (JPN); Satoshi Hamanaka; Takuma Echigo	2679
3rd place, bronze medalist(s)	Singapore (SIN); Brandon Lee; Christopher Hwang	2596
4	Japan (JPN); Yusuke Yamamoto; Hiroki Takada	2535
5	Hong Kong (HKG); Michael Mak; Tse Chung Yin	2504
6	Chinese Taipei (TPE); Chen Kuan-yeh; Chang Cheng	2453
7	Philippines (PHI); Collins Jose; Louie Chuaquico	2446
8	Indonesia (INA); Mohammad Iqbal; Adhiguna Widiantoro	2440
9	South Korea (KOR); Nam Ki-hoon; Park Ji-soo	2436
10	Indonesia (INA); Fachri Ibnu Askar; Dennis Ranova	2422
11	Thailand (THA); Dechochai Tinjiratip; Nuttapol Kophatthanachaicharoen	2419
12	Bahrain (BRN); Husain Ebrahim; Taha Ebrahim Selail	2413
13	Philippines (PHI); Bryan Gabay; Jayson Tubid	2407
14	Saudi Arabia (KSA); Faisal Sugati; Khalid Al-Hamdan	2377
15	Singapore (SIN); Basil Low; Justin Lim	2373
16	Hong Kong (HKG); Wong Kwan Yuen; Tsang Yin Ki	2354
17	Kuwait (KUW); Abdullah Ahmad; Mohammad Salem	2347
18	Thailand (THA); Phumin Klanbida; Peerawich Rungcharoen	2331
19	Kuwait (KUW); Mohammad Al-Wazzan; Mohannad Ebrahim	2279
20	Bahrain (BRN); Ahmed Al-Goud; Raed Abdulla	2271
21	Macau (MAC); Lao U Hin; Zoe Dias Ma	2208
22	China (CHN); Cai Xiaotian; Zhou Jiayang	2180
23	China (CHN); Zhang Kai; Yue Lian	2167
24	Chinese Taipei (TPE); Yang Shih-hsien; Cheng Hsing-yueh	2137
25	United Arab Emirates (UAE); Matar Al-Mansoory; Sultan Al-Qubaisi	2066
26	United Arab Emirates (UAE); Abdulla Al-Mulla; Saeed Al-Ameri	2038
27	Saudi Arabia (KSA); Qusi Ahmed; Abdulrahman Al-Aslani	2028
28	Vietnam (VIE); Phạm Gia Phú; La Minh Hoàng	1827
29	Uzbekistan (UZB); Rustam Babaliev; Khasan Samoylov	1583

==== Team of 4 ====
3–4 July

Rank	Team	Score
1st place, gold medalist(s)	Hong Kong (HKG)	4971
2nd place, silver medalist(s)	Singapore (SIN)	4952
3rd place, bronze medalist(s)	South Korea (KOR)	4935
4	Indonesia (INA)	4908
5	Philippines (PHI)	4860
6	Bahrain (BRN)	4762
7	Japan (JPN)	4731
8	Thailand (THA)	4668
9	Saudi Arabia (KSA)	4555
10	Chinese Taipei (TPE)	4437
11	Kuwait (KUW)	4430
12	China (CHN)	4361
13	United Arab Emirates (UAE)	4052

==== Masters ====
===== Preliminary =====
5–6 July

Rank	Athlete	Score
1	Basil Low (SIN)	3576
2	Choi Kyung-hwan (KOR)	3558
3	Collins Jose (PHI)	3507
4	Justin Lim (SIN)	3439
5	Peerawich Rungcharoen (THA)	3427
6	Satoshi Hamanaka (JPN)	3419
7	Michael Mak (HKG)	3390
8	Phumin Klanbida (THA)	3364
9	Takuma Echigo (JPN)	3355
10	Faisal Sugati (KSA)	3353
11	Jayson Tubid (PHI)	3305
12	Adhiguna Widiantoro (INA)	3300
13	Chen Kuan-yeh (TPE)	3284
14	Tse Chung Yin (HKG)	3261
15	Dennis Ranova (INA)	3193
16	Hwang Dong-jun (KOR)	3191

===== Finals =====
6 July

Semifinal		Grand final
		Basil Low (SIN)	501
Choi Kyung-hwan (KOR)	218	Choi Kyung-hwan (KOR)	433
Collins Jose (PHI)	211

=== Girls ===
==== Singles ====
1 July

Rank	Athlete	Score
1st place, gold medalist(s)	New Hui Fen (SIN)	1359
2nd place, silver medalist(s)	Misaki Mukotani (JPN)	1314
3rd place, bronze medalist(s)	Oh Nu-ri (KOR)	1308
4	Sim Ui-jin (KOR)	1285
5	Darshini Krishna (SIN)	1270
6	Rinnie Prominintia (INA)	1229
7	Chan Weng Sam (MAC)	1224
8	Priyanka (INA)	1215
9	Alexis Sy (PHI)	1211
10	Yoo Ka-hee (KOR)	1202
11	Madeline Llamas (PHI)	1196
12	Dyan Coronacion (PHI)	1189
13	Anthea Soh (SIN)	1184
14	Yanee Saebe (THA)	1180
15	Tanaprang Sathean (THA)	1171
16	Shinobu Saito (JPN)	1164
17	Yuka Oshima (JPN)	1145
18	Ilma Nur Jannah (SIN)	1142
19	Hong Hae-ni (KOR)	1108
20	Hui Tong (MAC)	1089
21	Patarapa Naovaniruth (THA)	1079
22	Wang Ying (CHN)	1076
23	Mikie Hamamoto (JPN)	1067
23	Syncheria Ng (INA)	1067
25	Hsu Shih-ting (TPE)	1036
26	Chang Yu-hsuan (TPE)	1033
26	Lingling de Guzman (PHI)	1033
28	Li Qing (CHN)	1032
29	Chen Szu-min (TPE)	1031
30	Lon Ka Man (MAC)	1028
31	Cheya Chantika (INA)	1003
32	Nattaporn Suwannavasit (THA)	986
33	Wu Junyi (CHN)	984
34	Chan Weng Hang (MAC)	944
35	Chang Hsu-chen (TPE)	922
36	Li Qing (CHN)	855

==== Doubles ====
2 July

Rank	Team	Score
1st place, gold medalist(s)	Singapore (SIN); Darshini Krishna; New Hui Fen	2680
2nd place, silver medalist(s)	Thailand (THA); Tanaprang Sathean; Yanee Saebe	2579
3rd place, bronze medalist(s)	South Korea (KOR); Sim Ui-jin; Oh Nu-ri	2504
4	Indonesia (INA); Priyanka; Rinnie Prominintia	2450
5	Japan (JPN); Yuka Oshima; Misaki Mukotani	2448
6	Singapore (SIN); Anthea Soh; Ilma Nur Jannah	2359
7	South Korea (KOR); Yoo Ka-hee; Hong Hae-ni	2355
8	Philippines (PHI); Lingling de Guzman; Madeline Llamas	2318
9	Philippines (PHI); Dyan Coronacion; Alexis Sy	2273
10	Macau (MAC); Chan Weng Sam; Hui Tong	2231
11	Japan (JPN); Shinobu Saito; Mikie Hamamoto	2211
12	Chinese Taipei (TPE); Chang Yu-hsuan; Chen Szu-min	2142
13	Thailand (THA); Patarapa Naovaniruth; Nattaporn Suwannavasit	2109
14	Macau (MAC); Chan Weng Hang; Lon Ka Man	2064
15	Indonesia (INA); Cheya Chantika; Syncheria Ng	2053
16	Chinese Taipei (TPE); Chang Hsu-chen; Hsu Shih-ting	2045
17	China (CHN); Li Qing; Wu Junyi	1961
18	China (CHN); Li Qing; Wang Ying	1808

==== Team of 4 ====
3–4 July

Rank	Team	Score
1st place, gold medalist(s)	South Korea (KOR)	4967
2nd place, silver medalist(s)	Singapore (SIN)	4894
3rd place, bronze medalist(s)	Japan (JPN)	4715
4	Philippines (PHI)	4464
5	Indonesia (INA)	4328
6	Thailand (THA)	4302
7	Macau (MAC)	4215
8	China (CHN)	4185
9	Chinese Taipei (TPE)	4133

==== Masters ====
===== Preliminary =====
5–6 July

Rank	Athlete	Score
1	New Hui Fen (SIN)	3524
2	Darshini Krishna (SIN)	3502
3	Sim Ui-jin (KOR)	3491
4	Shinobu Saito (JPN)	3396
5	Oh Nu-ri (KOR)	3372
6	Dyan Coronacion (PHI)	3338
7	Madeline Llamas (PHI)	3297
8	Misaki Mukotani (JPN)	3265
9	Priyanka (INA)	3237
10	Yanee Saebe (THA)	3215
11	Rinnie Prominintia (INA)	3145
12	Chang Yu-hsuan (TPE)	3004
13	Chan Weng Sam (MAC)	2951
14	Hui Tong (MAC)	2911
15	Hsu Shih-ting (TPE)	2812
16	Tanaprang Sathean (THA)	2773

===== Finals =====
6 July

Semifinal		Grand final
		New Hui Fen (SIN)	350
Darshini Krishna (SIN)	199	Sim Ui-jin (KOR)	443
Sim Ui-jin (KOR)	249
