= Beach volleyball at the 2018 Commonwealth Games – Men's tournament =

Beach Volleyball – Men's tournament at the 2018 Commonwealth Games
- Venue: Coolangatta Beachfront
- Dates: 6–12 April 2018
- Competitors: 24 from 12 nations

Medalists
| gold medal | Christopher McHugh; Damien Schumann | Australia |
| silver medal | Sam Pedlow; Sam Schachter | Canada |
| bronze medal | Ben O'Dea; Sam O'Dea | New Zealand |

The men's beach volleyball tournament at the 2018 Commonwealth Games was held on the Gold Coast, Australia from April 6 to 12. The beach volleyball competition was held at Coolangatta Beachfront. This was the first time that beach volleyball was held at the Commonwealth Games. A total of twelve men's teams competed (24 athletes, at 2 per team).

== Competition schedule ==
The following is the competition schedule for the men's tournament:

| P | Pool stage | ¼ | Quarter-finals | ½ | Semi-finals | B | Bronze medal match | G | Gold medal match |

| Event↓/Date → | Fri 6 | Sat 7 | Sun 8 | Mon 9 | Tue 10 | Wed 11 | Thu 12 | |
|---|---|---|---|---|---|---|---|---|
| Men | P | P | P | P | ¼ | ½ | B | G |

== Qualification ==
A total of 12 men's teams qualified to compete at the games.

| Event | Date | Location | Vacancies | Qualified |
|---|---|---|---|---|
| Host Nation | —N/a | —N/a | 1 | Australia |
| FIVB Beach Volleyball World Rankings | 31 October 2017 | —N/a | 4 | Canada; England; Trinidad and Tobago; New Zealand |
| European Qualification Tournament | 15–16 September 2017 | (Cyprus) Larnaca | 1 | Scotland |
| AVC Beach Tour 2017 | 8 April – 28 October 2017 | Various | 1 | Sri Lanka |
| African Qualification Tournament | 27–29 October 2017 | (Sierra Leone) Freetown | 1 | Sierra Leone |
| NORCECA Beach Volleyball Tour 2017 | 7 April – 13 November 2017 | Various | 1 | Saint Kitts and Nevis |
| Oceania Qualification Tournament | 6–8 December 2017 | (Vanuatu) Port Vila | 1 | Fiji |
| FIVB/CGF Invitation | TBD | —N/a | 2 | Cyprus; Mozambique |
| Total | | | 12 | |

== Medalists ==
| Event | Gold | Silver | Bronze |
|---|---|---|---|
| Men's tournament | Australia; Christopher McHugh; Damien Schumann | Canada; Sam Pedlow; Sam Schachter | New Zealand; Ben O'Dea; Sam O'Dea |

== Pools composition ==
The 12 teams would be split into three groups of four, with the top two teams in each group along with the two best third place teams advancing to the knockout round. Canada was the top ranked nation, followed by Australia, England and New Zealand. These four were placed in the three pools in a snake pattern. The remaining eight teams were randomly drawn among the other three pools.

== Preliminary round ==
- All times are AEST (UTC−10:00).

=== Pool A ===
| | PLD | W | L | SW | SL | SR | P |
|---|---|---|---|---|---|---|---|
| McHugh – Schumann (AUS) | 3 | 3 | 0 | 6 | 0 | MAX | 6 |
| Williams – Stewart (TTO) | 3 | 2 | 1 | 4 | 2 | 2.000 | 5 |
| Korowale – Cavula (FIJ) | 3 | 1 | 2 | 2 | 4 | 0.500 | 4 |
| Seabrookes – Hodge (SKN) | 3 | 0 | 3 | 0 | 6 | 0.000 | 3 |

| Qualified for the quarterfinals |

| 6 April 2018; 21:30 | McHugh – Schumann (AUS) | 2–0 | Korowale – Cavula (FIJ) | Coolangatta Beachfront |
| 6 April 2018; 21:30 | 21–9, 21–8; Report | | | Coolangatta Beachfront |

| 7 April 2018; 10:30 | Williams – Stewart (TTO) | 2–0 | Seabrookes – Hodge (SKN) | Coolangatta Beachfront |
| 7 April 2018; 10:30 | 21–14, 21–14; Report | | | Coolangatta Beachfront |

| 8 April 2018; 12:30 | McHugh – Schumann (AUS) | 2–0 | Seabrookes – Hodge (SKN) | Coolangatta Beachfront |
| 8 April 2018; 12:30 | 21–3, 21–11; Report | | | Coolangatta Beachfront |

| 8 April 2018; 15:00 | Williams – Stewart (TTO) | 2–0 | Korowale – Cavula (FIJ) | Coolangatta Beachfront |
| 8 April 2018; 15:00 | 21–9, 21–17; Report | | | Coolangatta Beachfront |

| 9 April 2018; 17:00 | Seabrookes – Hodge (SKN) | 0–2 | Korowale – Cavula (FIJ) | Coolangatta Beachfront |
| 9 April 2018; 17:00 | 16–21, 11–21; Report | | | Coolangatta Beachfront |

| 9 April 2018; 19:30 | McHugh – Schumann (AUS) | 2–0 | Williams – Stewart (TTO) | Coolangatta Beachfront |
| 9 April 2018; 19:30 | 21–13, 21–16; Report | | | Coolangatta Beachfront |

=== Pool B ===
| | PLD | W | L | SW | SL | SR | P |
|---|---|---|---|---|---|---|---|
| Pedlow – Schachter (CAN) | 3 | 3 | 0 | 6 | 0 | MAX | 6 |
| Miedzybrodzki – Cook (SCO) | 3 | 2 | 1 | 4 | 4 | 1.000 | 5 |
| Kamara – Lombi (SLE) | 3 | 1 | 2 | 3 | 4 | 0.750 | 4 |
| Pradeep – Yapa (SRI) | 3 | 0 | 3 | 1 | 6 | 0.167 | 3 |

| Qualified for the quarterfinals |

| 6 April 2018; 11:30 | Miedzybrodzki – Cook (SCO) | 2–1 | Pradeep – Yapa (SRI) | Coolangatta Beachfront |
| 6 April 2018; 11:30 | 21–15, 18–21, 16–14; Report | | | Coolangatta Beachfront |

| 6 April 2018; 17:00 | Pedlow – Schachter (CAN) | 2–0 | Kamara – Lombi (SLE) | Coolangatta Beachfront |
| 6 April 2018; 17:00 | 22–10, 21–14; Report | | | Coolangatta Beachfront |

| 7 April 2018; 20:30 | Pedlow – Schachter (CAN) | 2–0 | Pradeep – Yapa (SRI) | Coolangatta Beachfront |
| 7 April 2018; 20:30 | 21–11, 21–5; Report | | | Coolangatta Beachfront |

| 7 April 2018; 21:30 | Miedzybrodzki – Cook (SCO) | 2–1 | Kamara – Lombi (SLE) | Coolangatta Beachfront |
| 7 April 2018; 21:30 | 19–21, 21–18, 15–12; Report | | | Coolangatta Beachfront |

| 9 April 2018; 11:30 | Pradeep – Yapa (SRI) | 0–2 | Kamara – Lombi (SLE) | Coolangatta Beachfront |
| 9 April 2018; 11:30 | 17–21, 20–22; Report | | | Coolangatta Beachfront |

| 9 April 2018; 12:30 | Pedlow – Schachter (CAN) | 2–0 | Miedzybrodzki – Cook (SCO) | Coolangatta Beachfront |
| 9 April 2018; 12:30 | 21–12, 21–17; Report | | | Coolangatta Beachfront |

=== Pool C ===
| | PLD | W | L | SW | SL | SR | P |
|---|---|---|---|---|---|---|---|
| O'Dea – O'Dea (NZL) | 3 | 3 | 0 | 6 | 3 | 2.000 | 6 |
| Gregory – Sheaf (ENG) | 3 | 2 | 1 | 5 | 2 | 2.500 | 5 |
| Apostolou – Chrysostomou (CYP) | 3 | 1 | 2 | 3 | 4 | 0.750 | 4 |
| Acácio – Soares (MOZ) | 3 | 0 | 3 | 1 | 6 | 0.167 | 3 |

| Qualified for the quarterfinals |

| 6 April 2018; 10:30 | O'Dea – O'Dea (NZL) | 2–1 | Apostolou – Chrysostomou (CYP) | Coolangatta Beachfront |
| 6 April 2018; 10:30 | 16–21, 21–19, 15–11; Report | | | Coolangatta Beachfront |

| 6 April 2018; 16:00 | Gregory – Sheaf (ENG) | 2–0 | Acácio – Soares (MOZ) | Coolangatta Beachfront |
| 6 April 2018; 16:00 | 21–13, 21–14; Report | | | Coolangatta Beachfront |

| 7 April 2018; 15:00 | O'Dea – O'Dea (NZL) | 2–1 | Acácio – Soares (MOZ) | Coolangatta Beachfront |
| 7 April 2018; 15:00 | 19–21, 21–9, 15–11; Report | | | Coolangatta Beachfront |

| 7 April 2018; 16:00 | Gregory – Sheaf (ENG) | 2–0 | Apostolou – Chrysostomou (CYP) | Coolangatta Beachfront |
| 7 April 2018; 16:00 | 21–17, 21–7; Report | | | Coolangatta Beachfront |

| 8 April 2018; 19:30 | Apostolou – Chrysostomou (CYP) | 2–0 | Acácio – Soares (MOZ) | Coolangatta Beachfront |
| 8 April 2018; 19:30 | 21–18, 21–17; Report | | | Coolangatta Beachfront |

| 8 April 2018; 20:30 | Gregory – Sheaf (ENG) | 1–2 | O'Dea – O'Dea (NZL) | Coolangatta Beachfront |
| 8 April 2018; 20:30 | 21–14, 18–21, 8–15; Report | | | Coolangatta Beachfront |

== Knockout round ==
Quarterfinals
McHugh – Schumann (AUS) | 21 | 21
Kamara – Lombi (SLE) | 12 | 14
Miedzybrodzki – Cook (SCO) | 14 | 17
Gregory – Sheaf (ENG) | 21 | 21
O'Dea – O'Dea (NZL) | 21 | 21
Williams – Stewart (TTO) | 15 | 14
Apostolou – Chrysostomou (CYP) | 17 | 15
Pedlow – Schachter (CAN) | 21 | 21

Semifinals
McHugh – Schumann (AUS) | 21 | 21
Gregory – Sheaf (ENG) | 13 | 16
O'Dea – O'Dea (NZL) | 19 | 15
Pedlow – Schachter (CAN) | 21 | 21

Gold medal match
McHugh – Schumann (AUS) | 21 | 18 | 18
Pedlow – Schachter (CAN) | 19 | 21 | 16
Bronze medal match
Gregory – Sheaf (ENG) | 13 | 15
O'Dea – O'Dea (NZL) | 21 | 21

=== Quarterfinals ===
| 10 April 2018; 11:00 | Apostolou – Chrysostomou (CYP) | 0–2 | Pedlow – Schachter (CAN) | Coolangatta Beachfront |
| 10 April 2018; 11:00 | 17–21, 15–21; Report | | | Coolangatta Beachfront |

| 10 April 2018; 12:00 | Miedzybrodzki – Cook (SCO) | 0–2 | Gregory – Sheaf (ENG) | Coolangatta Beachfront |
| 10 April 2018; 12:00 | 14–21, 17–21; Report | | | Coolangatta Beachfront |

| 10 April 2018; 17:00 | O'Dea – O'Dea (NZL) | 2–0 | Williams – Stewart (TTO) | Coolangatta Beachfront |
| 10 April 2018; 17:00 | 21–15, 21–14; Report | | | Coolangatta Beachfront |

| 10 April 2018; 19:30 | McHugh – Schumann (AUS) | 2–0 | Kamara – Lombi (SLE) | Coolangatta Beachfront |
| 10 April 2018; 19:30 | 21–12, 21–14; Report | | | Coolangatta Beachfront |

=== Semifinals ===
| 11 April 2018; 16:00 | McHugh – Schumann (AUS) | 2–0 | Gregory – Sheaf (ENG) | Coolangatta Beachfront |
| 11 April 2018; 16:00 | 21–13, 21–16; Report | | | Coolangatta Beachfront |

| 11 April 2018; 17:00 | O'Dea – O'Dea (NZL) | 0–2 | Pedlow – Schachter (CAN) | Coolangatta Beachfront |
| 11 April 2018; 17:00 | 19–21, 15–21; Report | | | Coolangatta Beachfront |

=== Bronze medal match ===
| 12 April 2018; 15:30 | Gregory – Sheaf (ENG) | 0–2 | O'Dea – O'Dea (NZL) | Coolangatta Beachfront |
| 12 April 2018; 15:30 | 13–21, 15–21; Report | | | Coolangatta Beachfront |

=== Gold medal match ===
| 12 April 2018; 16:30 | McHugh – Schumann (AUS) | 2–1 | Pedlow – Schachter (CAN) | Coolangatta Beachfront |
| 12 April 2018; 16:30 | 21–19, 18–21, 18–16; Report | | | Coolangatta Beachfront |
