= Beach volleyball at the 2018 Asian Games – Women's tournament =

Asian Games competition

Women at the 2018 Asian Games
- Venue: Jakabaring Beach Volley Arena
- Dates: 19–27 August 2018
- Competitors: 36 from 10 nations

Medalists
gold medal	Wang Fan; Xia Xinyi	China
silver medal	Megumi Murakami; Miki Ishii	Japan
bronze medal	Dhita Juliana; Putu Dini Jasita Utami	Indonesia

The women's beach volleyball tournament at the 2018 Asian Games took place at the Jakabaring Beach Volley Arena, Palembang, Indonesia from 19 to 27 August 2018.

== Schedule ==
All times are Western Indonesia Time (UTC+07:00)

Date	Time	Event
Sunday, 19 August 2018	09:00	Preliminary round
Monday, 20 August 2018	09:00	Preliminary round
Tuesday, 21 August 2018	09:00	Preliminary round
Wednesday, 22 August 2018	15:40	Preliminary round
Thursday, 23 August 2018	09:00	Preliminary round
Friday, 24 August 2018	13:30	Round of 12
Saturday, 25 August 2018	09:00	Quarterfinals
Sunday, 26 August 2018	09:00	Semifinals
Monday, 27 August 2018	15:00	Bronze medal match
Monday, 27 August 2018	16:00	Gold medal match

== Results ==
Legend

- R — Retired

=== Preliminary round ===
==== Pool A ====
Pos	Team	Pld	W	L	Pts	SW	SL	SR	SPW	SPL	SPR	Qualification
1	Wang–Xia (CHN)	3	3	0	6	6	0	MAX	126	68	1.853	Quarterfinals
2	Kou–Liu (TPE)	3	2	1	5	4	2	2.000	112	84	1.333	Round of 12
3	Yuen–Au Yeung (HKG)	3	1	2	4	2	4	0.500	96	118	0.814	Round of 12
4	Kim–Kim (KOR)	3	0	3	3	0	6	0.000	62	126	0.492	

Source: OCA

Date		Score		Set 1	Set 2	Set 3
19 Aug	Wang–Xia (CHN)	2–0	Kim–Kim (KOR)	21–3	21–10	
19 Aug	Kou–Liu (TPE)	2–0	Yuen–Au Yeung (HKG)	21–13	21–14	
20 Aug	Wang–Xia (CHN)	2–0	Kou–Liu (TPE)	21–18	21–10	
21 Aug	Kou–Liu (TPE)	2–0	Kim–Kim (KOR)	21–11	21–4	
21 Aug	Wang–Xia (CHN)	2–0	Yuen–Au Yeung (HKG)	21–13	21–14	
23 Aug	Yuen–Au Yeung (HKG)	2–0	Kim–Kim (KOR)	21–15	21–19	

==== Pool B ====
Pos	Team	Pld	W	L	Pts	SW	SL	SR	SPW	SPL	SPR	Qualification
1	Murakami–Ishii (JPN)	3	3	0	6	6	0	MAX	126	75	1.680	Quarterfinals
2	Wang–Zeng (CHN)	3	2	1	5	4	4	1.000	131	127	1.031	Round of 12
3	Yu–Pan (TPE)	3	1	2	4	3	4	0.750	115	130	0.885	Round of 12
4	Trần–Trương (VIE)	3	0	3	3	1	6	0.167	96	136	0.706	

Source: OCA

Date		Score		Set 1	Set 2	Set 3
19 Aug	Murakami–Ishii (JPN)	2–0	Trần–Trương (VIE)	21–15	21–10	
19 Aug	Wang–Zeng (CHN)	2–1	Yu–Pan (TPE)	16–21	21–19	15–10
20 Aug	Murakami–Ishii (JPN)	2–0	Wang–Zeng (CHN)	21–12	21–15	
21 Aug	Yu–Pan (TPE)	2–0	Trần–Trương (VIE)	21–19	21–17	
23 Aug	Wang–Zeng (CHN)	2–1	Trần–Trương (VIE)	16–21	21–11	15–3
23 Aug	Murakami–Ishii (JPN)	2–0	Yu–Pan (TPE)	21–10	21–13	

==== Pool C ====
Pos	Team	Pld	W	L	Pts	SW	SL	SR	SPW	SPL	SPR	Qualification
1	Hasegawa–Futami (JPN)	4	4	0	8	8	1	8.000	188	132	1.424	Quarterfinals
2	Ratnasari–Eka (INA)	4	3	1	7	7	3	2.333	189	151	1.252	Round of 12
3	Numwong–Hongpak (THA)	4	2	2	6	5	5	1.000	182	148	1.230	Round of 12
4	Rachenko–Yeropkina (KAZ)	4	1	3	5	3	6	0.500	134	153	0.876	
5	de Sousa–Caminha (TLS)	4	0	4	4	0	8	0.000	59	168	0.351	

Source: OCA

Date		Score		Set 1	Set 2	Set 3
19 Aug	Numwong–Hongpak (THA)	2–0	de Sousa–Caminha (TLS)	21–5	21–7	
19 Aug	Ratnasari–Eka (INA)	2–0	Rachenko–Yeropkina (KAZ)	21–10	21–14	
20 Aug	Hasegawa–Futami (JPN)	2–0	Numwong–Hongpak (THA)	24–22	21–17	
20 Aug	de Sousa–Caminha (TLS)	0–2	Ratnasari–Eka (INA)	8–21	12–21	
21 Aug	Rachenko–Yeropkina (KAZ)	2–0	de Sousa–Caminha (TLS)	21–6	21–10	
21 Aug	Ratnasari–Eka (INA)	1–2	Hasegawa–Futami (JPN)	25–23	18–21	9–15
22 Aug	Numwong–Hongpak (THA)	2–1	Rachenko–Yeropkina (KAZ)	17–21	21–7	15–10
22 Aug	de Sousa–Caminha (TLS)	0–2	Hasegawa–Futami (JPN)	5–21	6–21	
23 Aug	Rachenko–Yeropkina (KAZ)	0–2	Hasegawa–Futami (JPN)	13–21	17–21	
23 Aug	Ratnasari–Eka (INA)	2–1	Numwong–Hongpak (THA)	17–21	21–16	15–11

==== Pool D ====
Pos	Team	Pld	W	L	Pts	SW	SL	SR	SPW	SPL	SPR	Qualification
1	Mashkova–Tsimbalova (KAZ)	4	4	0	8	8	1	8.000	180	115	1.565	Quarterfinals
2	Radarong–Udomchavee (THA)	4	3	1	7	7	3	2.333	194	167	1.162	Round of 12
3	Juliana–Utami (INA)	4	2	2	6	5	4	1.250	182	144	1.264	Round of 12
4	Ng–Wong (HKG)	4	1	3	5	2	7	0.286	124	180	0.689	
5	Nguyễn–Huỳnh (VIE)	4	0	4	4	1	8	0.125	112	186	0.602	

Source: OCA

Date		Score		Set 1	Set 2	Set 3
19 Aug	Radarong–Udomchavee (THA)	1–2	Mashkova–Tsimbalova (KAZ)	21–18	12–21	11–15
19 Aug	Juliana–Utami (INA)	2–0	Ng–Wong (HKG)	21–11	21–9	
20 Aug	Juliana–Utami (INA)	2–0	Nguyễn–Huỳnh (VIE)	21–10	21–6	
20 Aug	Ng–Wong (HKG)	0–2	Radarong–Udomchavee (THA)	9–21	10–21	
21 Aug	Juliana–Utami (INA)	0–2	Mashkova–Tsimbalova (KAZ)	12–21	17–21	
21 Aug	Ng–Wong (HKG)	2–1	Nguyễn–Huỳnh (VIE)	24–26	21–18	15–10
22 Aug	Radarong–Udomchavee (THA)	2–0	Nguyễn–Huỳnh (VIE)	21–10	21–15	
22 Aug	Mashkova–Tsimbalova (KAZ)	2–0	Ng–Wong (HKG)	21–12	21–13	
23 Aug	Radarong–Udomchavee (THA)	2–1	Juliana–Utami (INA)	14–21	23–21	29–27
23 Aug	Nguyễn–Huỳnh (VIE)	0–2	Mashkova–Tsimbalova (KAZ)	7–21	10–21	

=== Knockout round ===
Round of 16
Ratnasari–Eka (INA)	21	21
Yu–Pan (TPE)	18	14
Kou–Liu (TPE)	21	20	12
Juliana–Utami (INA)	19	22	15
Wang–Zeng (CHN)	21	21
Yuen–Au Yeung (HKG)	9	11
Radarong–Udomchavee (THA)	21
Numwong–Hongpak (THA)	9	R

Quarterfinals
Wang–Xia (CHN)	21	21
Ratnasari–Eka (INA)	16	14
Juliana–Utami (INA)	21	29
Hasegawa–Futami (JPN)	19	27
Mashkova–Tsimbalova (KAZ)	21	17	15
Wang–Zeng (CHN)	16	21	11
Radarong–Udomchavee (THA)	18	7
Murakami–Ishii (JPN)	21	21

Semifinals
Wang–Xia (CHN)	21	17	15
Juliana–Utami (INA)	10	21	9
Mashkova–Tsimbalova (KAZ)	21	12
Murakami–Ishii (JPN)	23	21

Gold medal match
Wang–Xia (CHN)	17	21	15
Murakami–Ishii (JPN)	21	19	10
Bronze medal match
Juliana–Utami (INA)	21	21
Mashkova–Tsimbalova (KAZ)	11	10

== Final standing ==
Rank	Team	Pld	W	L
1st place, gold medalist(s)	Wang Fan – Xia Xinyi (CHN)	6	6	0
2nd place, silver medalist(s)	Megumi Murakami – Miki Ishii (JPN)	6	5	1
3rd place, bronze medalist(s)	Dhita Juliana – Putu Dini Jasita Utami (INA)	8	5	3
4	Tatyana Mashkova – Irina Tsimbalova (KAZ)	7	5	2
5	Wang Xinxin – Zeng Jinjin (CHN)	5	3	2
5	Desi Ratnasari – Yokebed Purari Eka (INA)	6	4	2
5	Akiko Hasegawa – Azusa Futami (JPN)	5	4	1
5	Varapatsorn Radarong – Tanarattha Udomchavee (THA)	6	4	2
9	Yuen Ting Chi – Au Yeung Wai Yan (HKG)	4	1	3
9	Rumpaipruet Numwong – Khanittha Hongpak (THA)	5	2	3
9	Kou Nai-han – Liu Pi-hsin (TPE)	4	2	2
9	Yu Ya-hsuan – Pan Tzu-yi (TPE)	4	1	3
13	Ng Tin Lai – Wong Yuen Mei (HKG)	4	1	3
13	Alina Rachenko – Yelizaveta Yeropkina (KAZ)	4	1	3
13	Kim Hyun-ji – Kim Ha-na (KOR)	3	0	3
13	Trần Cẩm Thi – Trương Dương Thị Mỹ Huyền (VIE)	3	0	3
17	Letícia de Sousa – Adilijia Caminha (TLS)	4	0	4
17	Nguyễn Thị Cẩm Tiên – Huỳnh Đỗ Hồng Loan (VIE)	4	0	4
