= Christie Jenkins =

Australian trampoline gymnast

- Born: 26 March 1988 (age 38) Melbourne, Victoria
- Height: 1.73 m (5 ft 8 in)

Gymnastics career
- Discipline: Trampoline gymnastics
- Country represented: Australia
- Club: Cheltenham Youth Club
- Head coaches: Nikolay Zhuravlev, Jarrod Herriot
- Retired: 2011
Medal record
Christie Jenkins
Medal record
Women's beach volleyball
Representing Australia
National Volleyball League
Gold medal – first place	2013 Hermosa Beach	Beach

Christie Jenkins (born 26 March 1988) in Melbourne, Victoria is an Australian trampoline gymnast. Jenkins has competed at both Australian national and international level, and has been Australia's top-ranking female trampoline sports athlete. She was national champion for her age group from 1998 to 2003 and in Open division in 2004, 2005, 2006, 2009 and 2010. She competed in Individual trampoline, Double Mini-trampoline and Synchronised trampoline events, specialising in Double mini trampoline in later years.

== Personal life ==
Jenkins began trampoline sports at the age of five years, after being enrolled in trampoline lessons by her mother. At the beginning of 2011, Jenkins retired from trampoline sports to pursue a career in professional beach volleyball.

== Education ==
Jenkins graduated from Firbank Grammar School in Melbourne in 2005 as Dux of her year 12 cohort and was awarded perfect scores in Biology and Maths. Her academic capability extended to other subjects including English and Psychology, in which she was awarded near perfect scores.

In 2010, Jenkins graduated from Monash University in Melbourne with a dual degree in Bachelor of Arts (Chinese)/Bachelor of Economics. She has subsequently accepted a graduate position with ANZ Bank in Australia.

== Career ==
In 2010, Jenkins received two gold medals in the Double Mini Trampoline and Synchronized Trampoline events at the Indo Pacific Trampoline and Tumbling Championships in Kakegawa, Japan. Other notable achievements include representing Australia in the Trampoline World Championships in Metz, France and the 2009 World Games in Kaoshuing, Taiwan.

She won her first professional beach volleyball tournament in Hermosa Beach in August 2013 with her partner Iwona Lodzik coming into the tournament as the 6th seed qualifiers and the 29th seed in the main draw.
