= Ben O'Dea =

New Zealand beach volleyball player (born 1992)

Personal information
- Nationality: New Zealander
- Born: 6 May 1992 (age 34)
- Height: 196 cm (6 ft 5 in)
Beach volleyball information
Current teammate
- Years: Teammate
- 2017–present: Sam O'Dea
Medal record
Men's beach volleyball
Representing New Zealand
Commonwealth Games
Bronze medal – third place	2018	Gold Coast
FIVB Beach Volleyball World Tour
Bronze medal – third place	2017	Shepparton Open

Ben O'Dea (born 6 May 1992) is a New Zealand beach volleyball player.

Ben and his brother Sam O'Dea represented New Zealand at the 2018 Commonwealth Games, where they won the bronze medal in the men's pair competition. They were the nation's first men's beach volleyball team to compete at the Games. The pair also won the bronze medal at the Shepparton Open in Australia on the 2017 FIVB Beach Volleyball World Tour.

O'Dea is the grandson of Bob O'Dea, who played rugby union for the New Zealand national team, the All Blacks, in the 1950s.
