= Chen Chunxia =

Chinese beach volleyball player

Chen Chunxia (simplified Chinese: 陈春霞; traditional Chinese: 陳春霞; born 1991 or 1992) is a Chinese beach volleyball player. She competed at the 2012 Asian Beach Games in Haiyang, China, and won the silver medal along with Hu Anna.

Chen started training in beach volleyball when she was 14 years old. She began attending Shanxi University in 2008 where she majored in sports. That year, a coach noticed that she was tall at 1.8 m (5 ft 11 in) and asked her to train in beach volleyball. Every week, she attended three to four more-than-two-hour training sessions. During the beach volleyball event at the 2009 Asian Youth Games, she received a bronze medal with her teammate Lu Yuanyuan. At the beach volleyball event at the 2012 Asian Beach Games, Chen received the silver medal with her teammate Hu Anna.
