= Putu Dini Jasita Utami =

Indonesian beach volleyball player (born 1994)

Personal information
- Nationality: Indonesian
- Born: 8 January 1994 (age 32) Gianyar, Bali, Indonesia
- Height: 1.71 m (5 ft 7 in)
- Weight: 52 kg (115 lb)

Sport
- Country: Indonesia
- Sport: Beach Volleyball
- Coached by: Agus Salim
Medal record
Women's beach volleyball
Representing Indonesia
Asian Games
| Bronze medal – third place | 2018 Jakarta-Palembang | Women |
Asian Beach Games
| Bronze medal – third place | 2014 Phuket | Women |
Islamic Solidarity Games
| Gold medal – first place | 2013 Palembang | Women |
Southeast Asian Games
| Silver medal – second place | 2019 Philippines | Women |
| Silver medal – second place | 2021 Vietnam | Women |

Putu Dini Jasita Utami (born 8 January 1994) is an Indonesian beach volleyball player. Born in Gianyar, Bali, Utami now reside in Lombok, West Nusa Tenggara. As a beach volleyball player, Utami teamed-up with Dhita Juliana since 2011. Juliana and Utami won the gold medal for the West Nusa Tenggara province at the 2012 Pekan Olahraga Nasional held in Riau. In the international event, she and Juliana was the gold medalist at the 2013 Islamic Solidarity Games. She also won the bronze medal at the 2014 Asian Beach Games in Phuket, Thailand. In 2018, she claimed the bronze medal at the Asian Games.

Utami graduated in the sports science discipline at the IKIP Mataram in 2017.
