= Dhita Juliana =

Indonesian beach volleyball player (born 1993)

Personal information
- Nationality: Indonesian
- Born: 7 July 1993 (age 32) Bima, West Nusa Tenggara, Indonesia
- Height: 1.70 m (5 ft 7 in)
- Weight: 62 kg (137 lb)

Sport
- Country: Indonesia
- Sport: Beach Volleyball
- Coached by: Agus Salim
Medal record
Women's beach volleyball
Representing Indonesia
Asian Games
| Bronze medal – third place | 2018 Jakarta–Palembang | Women |
Asian Beach Games
| Bronze medal – third place | 2014 Phuket | Women |
Islamic Solidarity Games
| Gold medal – first place | 2013 Palembang | Women |
Southeast Asian Games
| Silver medal – second place | 2011 Jakarta–Palembang | Women |
| Silver medal – second place | 2019 Philippines | Women |
| Silver medal – second place | 2021 Vietnam | Women |
| Silver medal – second place | 2023 Cambodia | Women |

Dhita Juliana (born 7 July 1993) is an Indonesian beach volleyball player. Born in Bima, West Nusa Tenggara, Juliana initially started her career as an indoor volleyball player when she was in the elementary school. She then continued as a beach volleyball player after joining the Ministry of Youth and Sports Affairs programme in 2008. Partnered with Putu Utami, she won the gold medal for the West Nusa Tenggara province at the 2012 Pekan Olahraga Nasional held in Riau. In the international event, she was the gold medalist at the 2013 Islamic Solidarity Games. She also won the bronze medal at the 2014 Asian Beach Games in Phuket, Thailand. In 2018, she claimed the bronze medal at the Asian Games.
