= 2013 Beach Volleyball World Championships – Women's tournament =

Tournament details
- Host country: Poland
- Dates: 1 July – 6 July
- Teams: 48 (from 5 confederations)

Final positions
- Champions: China; Xue Chen; Zhang Xi (1st title)
- Runners-up: Germany; Karla Borger; Britta Büthe
- Third place: Brazil; Liliane Maestrini; Bárbara Seixas
- Fourth place: United States; April Ross; Whitney Pavlik

The women's tournament was held from 1 to 6 July 2013 in Stare Jabłonki, Poland.

== Preliminary round ==
Qualified for the Round of 32 as pool winners or runners-up
Qualified for the Round of 32 as one of the best four third-placed teams
Qualified for the Lucky Losers Playoffs
Eliminated

=== Pool A ===
Pos	Team	Pld	W	L	Pts	SW	SL	SR	SPW	SPL	SPR	Qualification
1	(Poland) Kołosińska–Brzostek	3	3	0	6	6	1	6.000	137	114	1.202	Round of 32
2	(Germany) Bieneck–Großner	3	2	1	5	5	3	1.667	161	145	1.110	Round of 32
3	(Switzerland) Forrer–Vergé-Dépré	3	1	2	4	3	5	0.600	151	156	0.968	Round of 32
4	(Latvia) Minusa–Ikauniece	3	0	3	3	1	6	0.167	105	139	0.755	

Date	Time		Score		Set 1	Set 2	Set 3	Total	Report
1 Jul	10:00	Forrer–Vergé-Dépré (Switzerland)	1–2	(Germany) Bieneck–Großner	26–24	26–28	9–15	61–67	
1 Jul	13:00	Kołosińska–Brzostek (Poland)	2–0	(Latvia) Minusa–Ikauniece	21–13	21–14		42–27	
2 Jul	08:45	Forrer–Vergé-Dépré (Switzerland)	2–1	(Latvia) Minusa–Ikauniece	21–12	18–21	16–14	55–47	
2 Jul	11:00	Kołosińska–Brzostek (Poland)	2–1	(Germany) Bieneck–Großner	21–16	15–21	17–15	53–52	
3 Jul	08:45	Kołosińska–Brzostek (Poland)	2–0	(Switzerland) Forrer–Vergé-Dépré	21–17	21–18		42–35	
3 Jul	08:45	Bieneck–Großner (Germany)	2–0	(Latvia) Minusa–Ikauniece	21–15	21–16		42–31	

=== Pool B ===
Pos	Team	Pld	W	L	Pts	SW	SL	SR	SPW	SPL	SPR	Qualification
1	(Finland) Nyström–Nyström	3	2	1	5	5	2	2.500	139	117	1.188	Round of 32
2	(Slovakia) Dubovcová–Nestarcová	3	2	1	5	4	3	1.333	133	120	1.108	Round of 32
3	(China) Xue–Zhang	3	2	1	5	4	2	2.000	115	108	1.065	Round of 32
4	(Poland) Paszek–Kociołek	3	0	3	3	0	6	0.000	86	128	0.672	

Date	Time		Score		Set 1	Set 2	Set 3	Total	Report
1 Jul	11:00	Xue–Zhang (China)	2–0	(Poland) Paszek–Kociołek	21–10	21–19		42–29	
1 Jul	11:00	Dubovcová–Nestarcová (Slovakia)	2–1	(Finland) Nyström–Nyström	18–21	21–19	15–13	54–53	
2 Jul	09:45	Xue–Zhang (China)	0–2	(Finland) Nyström–Nyström	17–21	14–21		31–42	
2 Jul	09:45	Dubovcová–Nestarcová (Slovakia)	2–0	(Poland) Paszek–Kociołek	21–9	21–16		42–25	
3 Jul	09:45	Xue–Zhang (China)	2–0	(Slovakia) Dubovcová–Nestarcová	21–19	21–18		42–37	
3 Jul	09:45	Nyström–Nyström (Finland)	2–0	(Poland) Paszek–Kociołek	23–21	21–11		44–32	

=== Pool C ===
Pos	Team	Pld	W	L	Pts	SW	SL	SR	SPW	SPL	SPR	Qualification
1	(United States) Ross–Pavlik	3	3	0	6	6	0	MAX	126	93	1.355	Round of 32
2	(United States) Fendrick–Hochevar	3	2	1	5	4	3	1.333	127	111	1.144	Round of 32
3	(Netherlands) Bloem–Kadijk	3	1	2	4	3	5	0.600	125	138	0.906	Round of 32
4	(Canada) Broder–Valjas	3	0	3	3	1	6	0.167	101	137	0.737	

Date	Time		Score		Set 1	Set 2	Set 3	Total	Report
1 Jul	18:00	Ross–Pavlik (United States)	2–0	(United States) Fendrick–Hochevar	21–15	21–15		42–30	
1 Jul	18:00	Broder–Valjas (Canada)	1–2	(Netherlands) Bloem–Kadijk	21–17	14–21	6–15	41–53	
2 Jul	16:00	Ross–Pavlik (United States)	2–0	(Canada) Broder–Valjas	21–11	21–18		42–29	
2 Jul	17:00	Fendrick–Hochevar (United States)	2–1	(Netherlands) Bloem–Kadijk	19–21	21–9	15–8	55–38	
3 Jul	17:00	Ross–Pavlik (United States)	2–0	(Netherlands) Bloem–Kadijk	21–19	21–15		42–34	
3 Jul	17:00	Fendrick–Hochevar (United States)	2–0	(Canada) Broder–Valjas	21–16	21–15		42–31	

=== Pool D ===
Pos	Team	Pld	W	L	Pts	SW	SL	SR	SPW	SPL	SPR	Qualification
1	(Netherlands) Meppelink–van Gestel	3	3	0	6	6	2	3.000	151	113	1.336	Round of 32
2	(United States) Fopma–Sweat	3	2	1	5	5	2	2.500	134	114	1.175	Round of 32
3	(Kazakhstan) Mashkova–Tsimbalova	3	1	2	4	3	5	0.600	126	143	0.881	Round of 32
4	(Paraguay) Pati–Michelle	3	0	3	3	1	6	0.167	93	134	0.694	

Date	Time		Score		Set 1	Set 2	Set 3	Total	Report
1 Jul	19:00	Mashkova–Tsimbalova (Kazakhstan)	0–2	(United States) Fopma–Sweat	15–21	17–21		32–42	
1 Jul	19:00	Meppelink–van Gestel (Netherlands)	2–0	(Paraguay) Pati–Michelle	21–13	21–6		42–19	
2 Jul	17:00	Meppelink–van Gestel (Netherlands)	2–1	(United States) Fopma–Sweat	21–17	21–23	15–10	57–50	
2 Jul	17:00	Mashkova–Tsimbalova (Kazakhstan)	2–1	(Paraguay) Pati–Michelle	14–21	21–16	15–12	50–49	
3 Jul	17:00	Meppelink–van Gestel (Netherlands)	2–1	(Kazakhstan) Mashkova–Tsimbalova	21–15	16–21	15–8	52–44	
3 Jul	17:00	Fopma–Sweat (United States)	2–0	(Paraguay) Pati–Michelle	21–12	21–13		42–25	

=== Pool E ===
Pos	Team	Pld	W	L	Pts	SW	SL	SR	SPW	SPL	SPR	Qualification
1	(Germany) Holtwick–Semmler	3	3	0	6	6	1	6.000	138	121	1.140	Round of 32
2	(Australia) Bawden–Clancy	3	2	1	5	5	2	2.500	141	117	1.205	Round of 32
3	(Netherlands) van der Vlist–Wesselink	3	1	2	4	2	4	0.500	112	119	0.941	
4	(Lithuania) Dumbauskaitė–Povilaitytė	3	0	3	3	0	6	0.000	93	127	0.732	

Date	Time		Score		Set 1	Set 2	Set 3	Total	Report
1 Jul	10:00	Bawden–Clancy (Australia)	2–0	(Netherlands) van der Vlist–Wesselink	22–20	21–17		43–37	
1 Jul	10:00	Holtwick–Semmler (Germany)	2–0	(Lithuania) Dumbauskaitė–Povilaitytė	21–15	21–18		42–33	
2 Jul	08:45	Holtwick–Semmler (Germany)	2–0	(Netherlands) van der Vlist–Wesselink	21–17	21–15		42–32	
2 Jul	08:45	Bawden–Clancy (Australia)	2–0	(Lithuania) Dumbauskaitė–Povilaitytė	21–19	21–7		42–26	
3 Jul	08:45	Holtwick–Semmler (Germany)	2–1	(Australia) Bawden–Clancy	23–21	15–21	16–14	64–66	
3 Jul	08:45	van der Vlist–Wesselink (Netherlands)	2–0	(Lithuania) Dumbauskaitė–Povilaitytė	22–20	21–14		43–34	

=== Pool F ===
Pos	Team	Pld	W	L	Pts	SW	SL	SR	SPW	SPL	SPR	Qualification
1	(Brazil) Antonelli–Agatha	3	3	0	6	6	0	MAX	134	99	1.354	Round of 32
2	(Germany) Ludwig–Walkenhorst	3	2	1	5	4	2	2.000	114	104	1.096	Round of 32
3	(Switzerland) Goricanec–Hüberli	3	1	2	4	2	4	0.500	114	118	0.966	
4	(Czech Republic) Bonnerová–Hermannová	3	0	3	3	0	6	0.000	87	128	0.680	

Date	Time		Score		Set 1	Set 2	Set 3	Total	Report
1 Jul	11:00	Antonelli–Agatha (Brazil)	2–0	(Switzerland) Goricanec–Hüberli	21–17	29–27		50–44	
1 Jul	12:00	Ludwig–Walkenhorst (Germany)	2–0	(Czech Republic) Bonnerová–Hermannová	21–13	23–21		44–34	
2 Jul	11:00	Antonelli–Agatha (Brazil)	2–0	(Czech Republic) Bonnerová–Hermannová	21–16	21–11		42–27	
2 Jul	11:00	Ludwig–Walkenhorst (Germany)	2–0	(Switzerland) Goricanec–Hüberli	21–17	21–11		42–28	
3 Jul	12:00	Antonelli–Agatha (Brazil)	2–0	(Germany) Ludwig–Walkenhorst	21–17	21–11		42–28	
3 Jul	16:00	Bonnerová–Hermannová (Czech Republic)	0–2	(Switzerland) Goricanec–Hüberli	14–21	12–21		26–42	

=== Pool G ===
Pos	Team	Pld	W	L	Pts	SW	SL	SR	SPW	SPL	SPR	Qualification
1	(Austria) Schwaiger–Schwaiger	3	3	0	6	6	1	6.000	134	112	1.196	Round of 32
2	(Canada) Pavan–Bansley	3	2	1	5	5	4	1.250	156	134	1.164	Round of 32
3	(Russia) Ukolova–Khomyakova	3	1	2	4	3	5	0.600	134	136	0.985	Round of 32
4	(Australia) Artacho–Ngauamo	3	0	3	3	2	6	0.333	108	150	0.720	

Date	Time		Score		Set 1	Set 2	Set 3	Total	Report
1 Jul	12:00	Schwaiger–Schwaiger (Austria)	2–0	(Australia) Artacho–Ngauamo	21–13	21–16		42–29	
1 Jul	12:00	Ukolova–Khomyakova (Russia)	1–2	(Canada) Pavan–Bansley	21–18	14–21	10–15	45–54	
2 Jul	11:00	Ukolova–Khomyakova (Russia)	2–1	(Australia) Artacho–Ngauamo	21–11	19–21	15–7	55–39	
2 Jul	15:00	Schwaiger–Schwaiger (Austria)	2–1	(Canada) Pavan–Bansley	13–21	21–15	15–13	49–49	
3 Jul	11:00	Artacho–Ngauamo (Australia)	1–2	(Canada) Pavan–Bansley	12–21	21–17	7–15	40–53	
3 Jul	11:00	Ukolova–Khomyakova (Russia)	0–2	(Austria) Schwaiger–Schwaiger	14–21	20–22		34–43	

=== Pool H ===
Pos	Team	Pld	W	L	Pts	SW	SL	SR	SPW	SPL	SPR	Qualification
1	(Germany) Borger–Büthe	3	3	0	6	6	1	6.000	138	116	1.190	Round of 32
2	(Italy) Cicolari–Menegatti	3	2	1	5	5	2	2.500	134	109	1.229	Round of 32
3	(Greece) Arvaniti–Karagkouni	3	1	2	4	2	5	0.400	111	132	0.841	
4	(Thailand) Radarong–Udomchavee	3	0	3	3	1	6	0.167	113	139	0.813	

Date	Time		Score		Set 1	Set 2	Set 3	Total	Report
1 Jul	13:00	Cicolari–Menegatti (Italy)	2–0	(Greece) Arvaniti–Karagkouni	21–13	21–12		42–25	
1 Jul	13:00	Borger–Büthe (Germany)	2–0	(Thailand) Radarong–Udomchavee	22–20	21–14		43–34	
2 Jul	15:00	Cicolari–Menegatti (Italy)	2–0	(Thailand) Radarong–Udomchavee	21–15	21–16		42–31	
2 Jul	15:00	Borger–Büthe (Germany)	2–0	(Greece) Arvaniti–Karagkouni	21–15	21–17		42–32	
3 Jul	15:00	Radarong–Udomchavee (Thailand)	1–2	(Greece) Arvaniti–Karagkouni	19–21	21–18	8–15	48–54	
3 Jul	16:00	Cicolari–Menegatti (Italy)	1–2	(Germany) Borger–Büthe	16–21	21–17	13–15	50–53	

=== Pool J ===
Pos	Team	Pld	W	L	Pts	SW	SL	SR	SPW	SPL	SPR	Qualification
1	(Austria) Hansel–Schützenhöfer	3	3	0	6	6	2	3.000	152	133	1.143	Round of 32
2	(Switzerland) Zumkehr–Heidrich	3	2	1	5	5	4	1.250	172	160	1.075	Round of 32
3	(Netherlands) Keizer–van Iersel	3	1	2	4	4	4	1.000	148	141	1.050	Round of 32
4	(Switzerland) Kayser–Grässli	3	0	3	3	1	6	0.167	105	143	0.734	

Date	Time		Score		Set 1	Set 2	Set 3	Total	Report
1 Jul	11:00	Zumkehr–Heidrich (Switzerland)	2–1	(Switzerland) Kayser–Grässli	23–25	21–11	15–13	59–49	
1 Jul	12:00	Keizer–van Iersel (Netherlands)	1–2	(Austria) Hansel–Schützenhöfer	18–21	21–17	13–15	52–53	
2 Jul	09:45	Zumkehr–Heidrich (Switzerland)	1–2	(Austria) Hansel–Schützenhöfer	21–17	19–21	17–19	57–57	
2 Jul	09:45	Keizer–van Iersel (Netherlands)	2–0	(Switzerland) Kayser–Grässli	21–17	21–15		42–32	
3 Jul	09:45	Keizer–van Iersel (Netherlands)	1–2	(Switzerland) Zumkehr–Heidrich	21–18	18–21	15–17	54–56	
3 Jul	09:45	Hansel–Schützenhöfer (Austria)	2–0	(Switzerland) Kayser–Grässli	21–11	21–13		42–23	

=== Pool K ===
Pos	Team	Pld	W	L	Pts	SW	SL	SR	SPW	SPL	SPR	Qualification
1	(Czech Republic) Kolocová–Sluková	3	2	1	5	5	2	2.500	141	122	1.156	Round of 32
2	(Spain) Liliana–Baquerizo	3	2	1	5	5	3	1.667	145	136	1.066	Round of 32
3	(United States) Ross–Day	3	2	1	5	4	4	1.000	145	137	1.058	Round of 32
4	(Russia) Prokopeva–Popova	3	0	3	3	1	6	0.167	108	144	0.750	

Date	Time		Score		Set 1	Set 2	Set 3	Total	Report
1 Jul	10:00	Kolocová–Sluková (Czech Republic)	2–0	(Russia) Prokopeva–Popova	21–17	21–15		42–32	
1 Jul	17:00	Liliana–Baquerizo (Spain)	1–2	(United States) Ross–Day	21–14	17–21	10–15	48–50	
2 Jul	16:00	Kolocová–Sluková (Czech Republic)	2–0	(United States) Ross–Day	21–19	21–16		42–35	
2 Jul	17:00	Liliana–Baquerizo (Spain)	2–0	(Russia) Prokopeva–Popova	21–10	21–19		42–29	
3 Jul	16:00	Liliana–Baquerizo (Spain)	2–1	(Czech Republic) Kolocová–Sluková	14–21	26–24	15–12	55–57	
3 Jul	16:00	Prokopeva–Popova (Russia)	1–2	(United States) Ross–Day	11–21	26–24	10–15	47–60	

=== Pool L ===
Pos	Team	Pld	W	L	Pts	SW	SL	SR	SPW	SPL	SPR	Qualification
1	(Brazil) Maria Clara–Carol	3	3	0	6	6	1	6.000	97	79	1.228	Round of 32
2	(Brazil) Talita–Lima	3	2	1	5	5	2	2.500	132	108	1.222	Round of 32
3	(Netherlands) Sinnema–Stiekema	3	1	2	4	2	4	0.500	95	109	0.872	
4	(England) Dampney–Boulton	3	0	3	3	0	6	0.000	56	126	0.444	

Date	Time		Score		Set 1	Set 2	Set 3	Total	Report
1 Jul	13:00	Dampney–Boulton (England)	0–2	(Netherlands) Sinnema–Stiekema	11–21	14–21		25–42	
1 Jul	16:00	Talita–Lima (Brazil)	1–2	(Brazil) Maria Clara–Carol	17–21	21–19	10–15	48–55	
2 Jul	15:00	Maria Clara–Carol (Brazil)	2–0	(Netherlands) Sinnema–Stiekema	21–14	21–17		42–31	
2 Jul	15:00	Talita–Lima (Brazil)	2–0	(England) Dampney–Boulton	21–14	21–17		42–31	
3 Jul	15:00	Maria Clara–Carol (Brazil)	2–0	(England) Dampney–Boulton	21–0	21–0		42–0	walkover
3 Jul	15:00	Talita–Lima (Brazil)	2–0	(Netherlands) Sinnema–Stiekema	21–12	21–10		42–22	

=== Pool M ===
Pos	Team	Pld	W	L	Pts	SW	SL	SR	SPW	SPL	SPR	Qualification
1	(Brazil) Lili–Seixas	3	3	0	6	6	0	MAX	126	85	1.482	Round of 32
2	(Vanuatu) Elwin–Iatika	3	1	2	4	3	4	0.750	115	123	0.935	Round of 32
3	(Italy) Gioria–Giombini	3	1	2	4	3	5	0.600	137	137	1.000	Round of 32
4	(Poland) Bekier–Oleksy	3	1	2	4	2	5	0.400	101	134	0.754	

Date	Time		Score		Set 1	Set 2	Set 3	Total	Report
1 Jul	16:00	Bekier–Oleksy (Poland)	0–2	(Vanuatu) Elwin–Iatika	14–21	15–21		29–42	
1 Jul	17:00	Lili–Seixas (Brazil)	2–0	(Italy) Gioria–Giombini	21–16	21–19		42–35	
2 Jul	08:45	Bekier–Oleksy (Poland)	2–1	(Italy) Gioria–Giombini	9–21	21–19	15–10	45–50	
2 Jul	16:00	Lili–Seixas (Brazil)	2–0	(Vanuatu) Elwin–Iatika	21–10	21–13		42–23	
3 Jul	15:00	Bekier–Oleksy (Poland)	0–2	(Brazil) Lili–Seixas	13–21	14–21		27–42	
3 Jul	16:00	Gioria–Giombini (Italy)	2–1	(Vanuatu) Elwin–Iatika	16–21	21–18	15–11	52–50	

=== Ranking of third-placed teams ===
The eight best third-placed teams advanced to the round of 32.

Pos	Team	Pld	W	L	Pts	SW	SL	SR	SPW	SPL	SPR	Qualification
1	(China) Xue–Zhang	3	2	1	5	4	2	2.000	115	108	1.065	Round of 32
2	(United States) Ross–Day	3	2	1	5	4	4	1.000	145	137	1.058	Round of 32
3	(Netherlands) Keizer–van Iersel	3	1	2	4	4	4	1.000	148	141	1.050	Round of 32
4	(Italy) Gioria–Giombini	3	1	2	4	3	5	0.600	137	137	1.000	Round of 32
5	(Russia) Ukolova–Khomyakova	3	1	2	4	3	5	0.600	134	136	0.985	Round of 32
6	(Switzerland) Forrer–Vergé-Dépré	3	1	2	4	3	5	0.600	151	156	0.968	Round of 32
7	(Netherlands) Bloem–Kadijk	3	1	2	4	3	5	0.600	125	138	0.906	Round of 32
8	(Kazakhstan) Mashkova–Tsimbalova	3	1	2	4	3	5	0.600	126	143	0.881	Round of 32
9	(Switzerland) Goricanec–Hüberli	3	1	2	4	2	4	0.500	114	118	0.966	
10	(Netherlands) van der Vlist–Wesselink	3	1	2	4	2	4	0.500	112	119	0.941	
11	(Netherlands) Sinnema–Stiekema	3	1	2	4	2	4	0.500	95	109	0.872	
12	(Greece) Arvaniti–Karagkouni	3	1	2	4	2	5	0.400	111	132	0.841	

=== Knockout stage ===
==== Round of 32 ====
Date	Time		Score		Set 1	Set 2	Set 3	Total	Report
4 Jul	11:00	Kołosińska–Brzostek (Poland)	2–0	(Netherlands) Bloem–Kadijk	21–18	21–13		42–31	
4 Jul	12:00	Cicolari–Menegatti (Italy)	2–1	(Germany) Bieneck–Großner	18–21	21–15	15–11	54–47	
4 Jul	12:00	Holtwick–Semmler (Germany)	1–2	(Netherlands) Keizer–van Iersel	21–15	17–21	13–15	51–51	
4 Jul	12:00	Kolocová–Sluková (Czech Republic)	0–2	(Vanuatu) Elwin–Iatika	18–21	19–21		37–42	
4 Jul	12:00	Talita–Lima (Brazil)	1–2	(Germany) Ludwig–Walkenhorst	17–21	21–14	18–20	56–55	
4 Jul	13:00	Lili–Seixas (Brazil)	2–0	(Switzerland) Zumkehr–Heidrich	21–13	21–12		42–25	
4 Jul	13:00	Ukolova–Khomyakova (Russia)	2–1	(Netherlands) Meppelink–van Gestel	23–25	21–17	15–11	59–53	
4 Jul	13:00	Mashkova–Tsimbalova (Kazakhstan)	0–2	(Finland) Nyström–Nyström	15–21	18–21		33–42	
4 Jul	18:00	Antonelli–Agatha (Brazil)	0–2	(China) Xue–Zhang	21–23	14–21		35–44	
4 Jul	18:00	Bawden–Clancy (Australia)	0–2	(Spain) Liliana–Baquerizo	16–21	17–21		33–42	
4 Jul	18:00	Hansel–Schützenhöfer (Austria)	2–1	(Canada) Pavan–Bansley	13–21	21–19	15–7	49–47	
4 Jul	18:00	Schwaiger–Schwaiger (Austria)	2–0	(United States) Ross–Day	21–19	21–19		42–38	
4 Jul	19:00	Ross–Pavlik (United States)	2–0	(Switzerland) Forrer–Vergé-Dépré	21–18	21–16		42–34	
4 Jul	19:00	Borger–Büthe (Germany)	2–0	(Italy) Gioria–Giombini	21–18	21–14		42–32	
4 Jul	19:00	Maria Clara–Carol (Brazil)	1–2	(Slovakia) Dubovcová–Nestarcová	21–10	18–21	21–23	60–54	
4 Jul	19:00	Fopma–Sweat (United States)	1–2	(United States) Fendrick–Hochevar	21–19	13–21	12–15	46–55	

==== Round of 16 ====
Date	Time		Score		Set 1	Set 2	Set 3	Total	Report
5 Jul	11:00	Kołosińska–Brzostek (Poland)	0–2	(Italy) Cicolari–Menegatti	14–21	12–21		26–42	
5 Jul	11:00	Lili–Seixas (Brazil)	2–1	(Netherlands) Keizer–van Iersel	21–14	18–21	15–12	54–47	
5 Jul	11:00	Ross–Pavlik (United States)	2–0	(Spain) Liliana–Baquerizo	21–13	21–15		42–28	
5 Jul	11:00	Hansel–Schützenhöfer (Austria)	1–2	(Austria) Schwaiger–Schwaiger	16–21	21–17	13–15	50–53	
5 Jul	12:00	Xue–Zhang (China)	2–0	(Vanuatu) Elwin–Iatika	22–20	21–11		43–31	
5 Jul	12:00	Ludwig–Walkenhorst (Germany)	2–0	(Russia) Ukolova–Khomyakova	21–19	21–16		42–35	
5 Jul	12:00	Borger–Büthe (Germany)	2–0	(Slovakia) Dubovcová–Nestarcová	21–17	21–12		42–29	
5 Jul	12:00	Fendrick–Hochevar (United States)	2–0	(Finland) Nyström–Nyström	21–15	21–19		42–34	

==== Quarterfinals ====
Date	Time		Score		Set 1	Set 2	Set 3	Total	Report
5 Jul	18:00	Cicolari–Menegatti (Italy)	1–2	(Brazil) Lili–Seixas	22–20	15–21	13–15	50–56	
5 Jul	18:00	Ross–Pavlik (United States)	2–1	(Austria) Schwaiger–Schwaiger	19–21	21–19	15–13	55–53	
5 Jul	19:00	Xue–Zhang (China)	2–0	(Germany) Ludwig–Walkenhorst	21–15	21–15		42–30	
5 Jul	19:00	Borger–Büthe (Germany)	2–1	(United States) Fendrick–Hochevar	17–21	21–16	15–11	53–48	

==== Semifinals ====
Date	Time		Score		Set 1	Set 2	Set 3	Total	Report
6 Jul	12:00	Lili–Seixas (Brazil)	0–2	(China) Xue–Zhang	11–21	17–21		28–42	
6 Jul	13:00	Ross–Pavlik (United States)	0–2	(Germany) Borger–Büthe	15–21	19–21		34–42	

==== Third place game ====
Date	Time		Score		Set 1	Set 2	Set 3	Total	Report
6 Jul	17:00	Lili–Seixas (Brazil)	2–0	(United States) Ross–Pavlik	21–18	21–15		42–33	

==== Final ====
Date	Time		Score		Set 1	Set 2	Set 3	Total	Report
6 Jul	18:00	Xue–Zhang (China)	2–1	(Germany) Borger–Büthe	18–21	21–17	21–19	60–57	
