= Ekaterina Khomyakova =

Russian literary figure of 19th century

- Екатерина Михайловна Хомякова
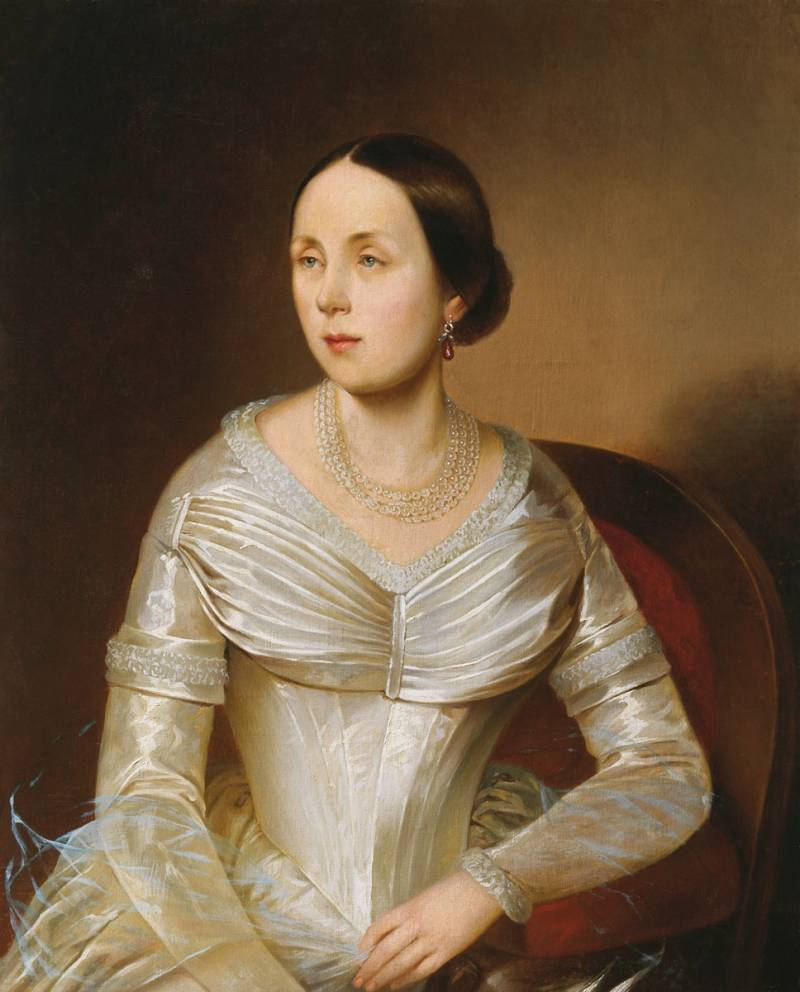
- Born: 15 July 1817; Simbirsk, Russian Empire
- Died: 26 January 1852; Moscow, Russian Empire
- Occupation: literary salon hostess
- Spouse: Aleksey Khomyakov
- Children: Nikolay Khomyakov

Ekaterina Khomyakova (15 [27] July 1817, Simbirsk — 26 January [7 February] 1852, Moscow) was the hostess of a literary salon, sister of the poet N. M. Yazykov, scholar P. M. Yazykov. The youthful love of N. A. Motovilov, an associate of Seraphim of Sarov, with whom the future administrator of the Seraphimo-Diveyevsky Convent discussed his interest.

She was the wife of the philosopher and poet A.S. Khomyakov, his literary secretary, and the mother of the Chairman of the State Duma N.A. Khomyakov. Several lyrical poems by N. M. Yazykov and A.S. Khomyakov are dedicated to her. The poem The Resurrection of Lazarus, written by A.S. Khomyakov on the occasion of his wife's death, was set to music by S.V. Rachmaninov in 1912. V. Rachmaninov. A model for the portraits of Karl Gampeln, Shandor Kozin and A.S. Khomyakov. According to Gogol scholars, E.M. Khomyakova was the invisible centre of the spiritual life of the Moscow Slavophile community. The letters of E.M. Khomyakova with the reactions of the inhabitants of Zamoskvorets to the death of Alexander Pushkin are of interest for Pushkin studies.

A close friend of E.M. Khomyakova was N.V. Gogol, and he regarded her as one of the most remarkable women of his time. In confidential conversations with her, the very secretive writer was very open, telling her about his plans for the future. The early death of E. M. Khomyakova was an irreparable loss for Gogol as well as for A.S. Khomyakov. Under her influence, the lonely writer had thoughts of his own imminent death, increased ascetic and mystical moods, culminating in illness. In the end, as a result of this and other circumstances, Gogol abandoned creative activity, burned his works and died soon.

== Biography ==
Ekaterina Mikhailovna belonged to the old noble Yazykov family, her father was ensign Mikhail Petrovich Yazykov (1767–1819), her mother Ekaterina Alexandrovna Yermolova (1777–1831) was the daughter of the Simbirsk noble leader A. F. Yermolov. They had three sons: Peter, Alexander, Nicholas, and three daughters: Praskovya, Alexandra and Ekaterina. She was the youngest daughter, two years after her birth her father died and Ekaterina lived only with her sick mother.

=== N. A. Motovilov ===
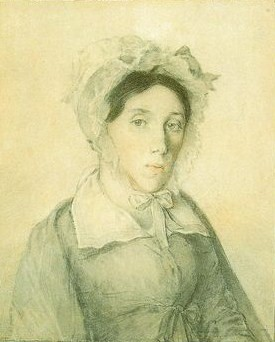
Khomyakova's mother in watercolour by P. F. Sokolov

According to S. A. Nilus, in her early youth Ekaterina was in love with Nicolai Alexandrovich Motovilov, an associate of Seraphim of Sarov. His infatuation with her began around 1829, when he was nineteen and she was twelve. The Yazykovs' Simbirsk estates in Mokroy Bugurma and Russkaya Tsilna were located near the Motovilov estates. Two years later, N. A. Motovilov, who was in love, asked Seraphim of Sarov for a blessing for his marriage with Ekaterina. He described Ekaterina Mikhailovna to him as follows: "She is not a beauty in the full sense of the word, but very pretty. But above all I am enchanted by something gracious, divine that shines in her face, something that touches the human soul in a way that many beauties do not have in themselves".

According to Motovilov, Ekaterina Mikhailovna lived with her mother "as in a convent — she always read her morning and evening prayers, and as her mother was very religious and pious, there were often prayers and all-night services at her bedside. Having been brought up for more than ten years by such a God-fearing mother, she herself became like a nun. This is what I like most about her".

Motovilov's conversation with Seraphim of Sarov took place in October 1831, and then the elder revealed to the young man that he was destined for another bride — Elena Ivanovna Milyukova (b. 1823), at that time still a minor niece of Martha Diveyevskaya, whom, according to Seraphim of Sarov's prediction, he was to marry. Father Seraphim instructed the ardent young man in this way:

— According to a new Synod decree, no man under 18 and no girl under 16 can marry. Shouldn't you wait eight or ten years for your God-ordained bride? How can you marry her now? You can't, she's still very young,' he gently explained to his companion, but Motovilov insisted.

— Who are you talking to me about? — he asked me.

— About Ekaterina Mikhailovna Yazykova.

— Ah!' he said. — Well, I am not talking about her, poor me, I am talking about the bride God has destined for you, and she, I assure you, your God, will not be more than eight years and a few months old.

Nevertheless, for some time N. A. Motovilov continued to expect reciprocity from Ekaterina and planned to marry her. In May 1832, when Ekaterina was 14 years old (and he thought she was 16-17), he proposed to her, disobeying the elder, and received a final refusal, because she was already married to A. S. Khomyakov. The fact that Ekaterina Mikhailovna was already engaged to Khomyakov in 1832 was not directly mentioned by Motovilov in his notes: "And when it was refused to me in the hand of Ekaterina Mikhailovna Yazykova and General Mandryka in the house of her aunt Praskovia Alexandrovna Berh said to me that she was already engaged, then I had a stroke and I couldn't feel my hands nor feet, and my old disease affected me stronger".

For his disobedience Motovilov later earned Seraphim of Sarov's reproaches and the instruction to provide for the support of the Diveyev community, which Motovilov did. Motovilov's love for Ekaterina Mikhailovna lasted more than seven years until she married Khomyakov. (Note: In N. A. Motovilov's 1861 Report to His Eminence Isidore, Metropolitan of St Petersburg and Novgorod, the chronology of events is confusing: he puts his meeting with Catherine in 1830, the year he proposed to her, and then gives 1832 and 1833, and so on. In the same note, Motovilov described the circumstances of his arrest in 1833 by order of the acting civil governor of Simbirsk, Alexander Mikhailovich Zagryazhsky, who, in exhorting Motovilov to reveal the alleged secret society of conspirators, promised him, among other things, that that the Empress Alexandra Feodorovna herself would not only marry me to Ekaterina Mikhailovna Yazykova, whom I loved passionately at the time and who was then married to Alexei Stepanovich Khomyakov, but that the Empress herself would be happy to be our adopted mother.)

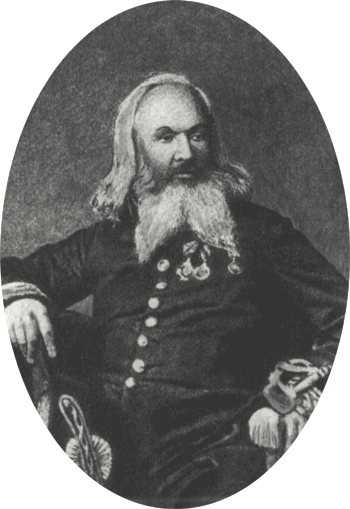
N. A. Motovilov far outlived E. M. Khomyakova

The literary scholar V.I. Melnik doubts that it was all about Motovilov's enemies, because it is not known how the personal relations between Ekaterina Mikhailovna and Nicolai Alexandrovich developed. V. I. Melnik concludes from the subsequent events we that Ekaterina Mikhailovna was waiting for someone else.

V. I. Melnik suggests that if she had loved Motovilov as much as she loved Khomyakov, she would have married him; her letters show that she was an amorous young woman, the researcher believes. But the fact is that her future husband had a number of undeniable advantages that Motovilov did not. Motovilov was inferior to Khomyakov in terms of social standing, literary talent and capital. Motovilov was related to Khomiakov in religious depth, they were both landowners, but in everything else he lost to the future leader of the Slavophiles. Marriage to Khomiakov brought Yazykova to the centre of Moscow's cultural life and helped her to get closer to the leading Russian literary figures: Gogol, Pushkin, although this was also facilitated by her brother Nicolai's position in Russian literature. But Khomyakov himself was also an outstanding person, capable of turning the head of a provincial girl: poet, philosopher, artist, mechanical inventor, homeopathic doctor, possessor of encyclopaedic knowledge in 15 scientific fields, polyglot who learnt 32 languages, etc.

=== Marriage ===
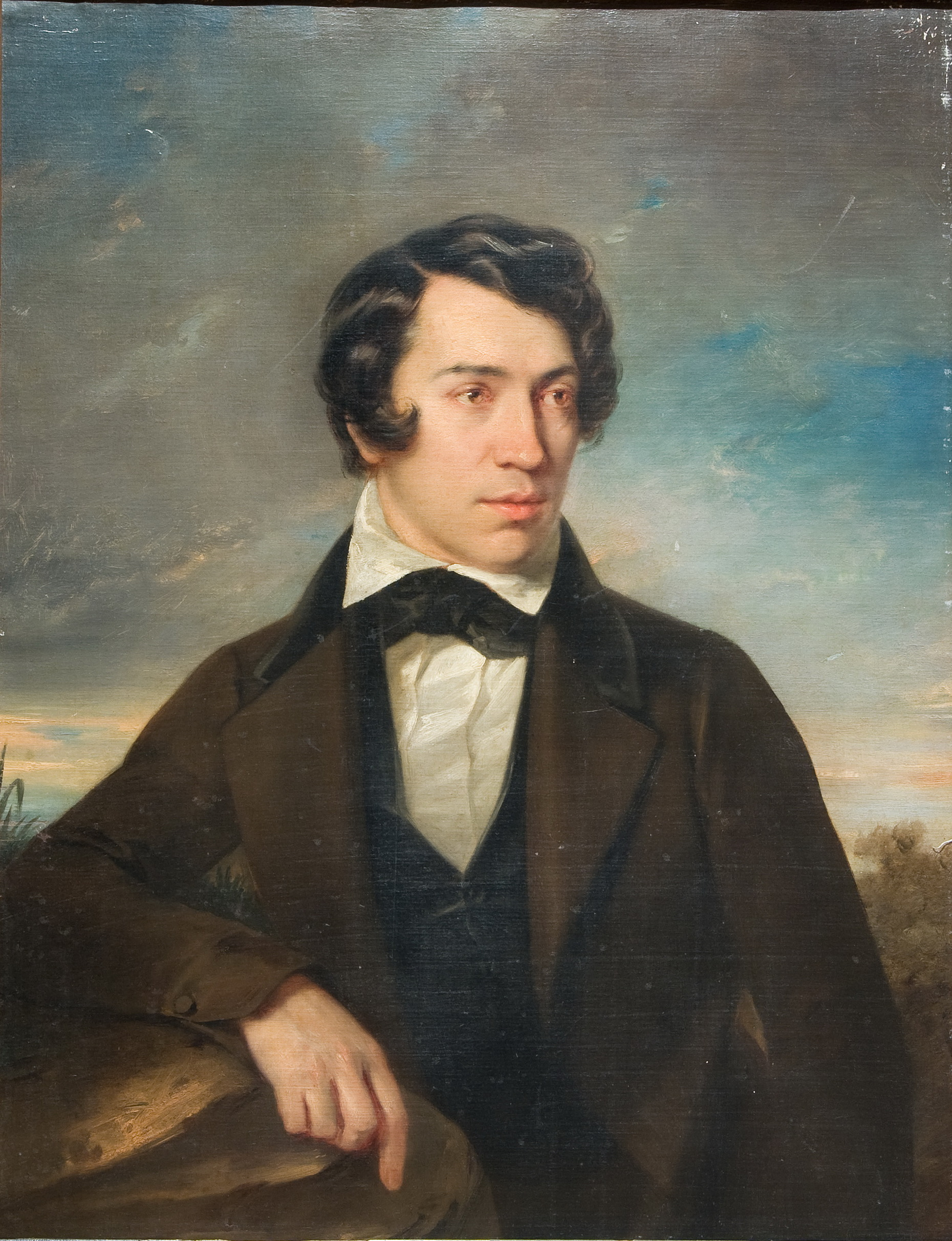
Aleksey Khomyakov, Selfportrait, 1842

According to V. I. Melnik, Ekaterina Mikhailovna fell in love with Alexei Stepanovich Khomyakov immediately and irrevocably. Her letters to her brother were full of sentimental enthusiasm for her lover: "Oh Lord, I love him, if only he knew how much I love him!" Their love was mutual from the start, and their marriage began without any previous affairs.

This is the subject of a Khomyakov family legend (told by Alexei Stepanovich's biographer V. N. Lyaskovsky), according to which M. A. Khomyakova made her sons promise to keep their chastity until marriage. Khomyakov's love for Yazykova was preceded only by a strong feeling for the famous capital beauty Alexandra Osipovna Smirnova, who rejected his advances. Ekaterina Yazykova was not so royal, but Khomyakov no longer needed her. Everything he sought and valued in a woman he found in his wife.

Different sources report different information, whether Alexei Stepanovich and Ekaterina Mikhailovna's meeting and closeness got immediately or gradually (Khomyakov was 13 years older than his wife and could visit the Yazykovs when she was still a child). Some biographers claim that Khomyakov married Yazykova, "with whom he had long been passionately in love".

If he had been in love from the moment of his engagement in 1832, as V. I. Melnik and some others mention, there would be no contradiction. However, most biographers agree that their meeting and mutual interest occurred only in the winter of 1835-1836, i.e. six months before the marriage. In addition, there is information that as early as 1834 A. S. Khomyakov was courting Z. N. Poltavtseva, a relative of Prince P. V. Dolgorukov, but was rejected by her, which also contradicts the version of a long-standing love affair with the young Khomyakov.

Khomyakov's biographer V. N. Lyaskovsky wrote at the end of the 19th century: "Through the poet N. M. Yazykov, who belonged to the Kireevsky circle, Alexei Stepanovich met his sister Katerina Mikhailovna, and on 5 July 1836 they were married ... in the house church of the Counts Panin on Nikitskaya in Moscow". (Note: The sources are again contradictory about this fact. Below it is reported that the wedding took place in St George's Church of St George's Monastery.)

Valery Alekseev gives a different account of the circumstances of E. M. Khomyakova's marriage, without mentioning her engagement to A.S. Khomyakov in 1832. After the death of Ekaterina's mother in 1831, her older sister, Praskovya Mikhailovna (1807–1862), who was married to Pyotr Alexandrovich Bestuzhev, the leader of the nobility of the Syzran region of Simbirsk Governorate, took care of her upbringing. The Bestuzhevs lived on their estate in Repyovka, Syzransky uyezd, until the summer of 1835. In the autumn of the same year, the Bestuzhev family moved to Moscow with Ekaterina Mikhailovna. Perhaps the initiative to move the Bestuzhevs from the deep provinces to Moscow did not come from them, but from Nicolai Yazykov.

There is a belief that A. S. Khomyakov was invited to be the girl's English tutor. The collusion of relatives quickly led to a convenient result for all. In the spring of 1836, the news of the future marriage spread beyond Moscow. Alexander Pushkin wrote to Natalya Nikolayevna twice about the forthcoming wedding — on 6 and 11 May 1836: "The poet Khomyakov is getting married to Yazykova, the poet's sister. A rich bridegroom, a rich bride". Pushkin described Khomyakov's bride to his wife as follows "I saw Khomyakov's bride. I could not see her in the twilight. She is, as the late Gnedich said, pas une belle femme, but une jolie figuriette". (Note: In French "not a beautiful woman, but a pretty girl".)

On Monday, 5 July 1836, Ekaterina Mikhailovna married A. S. Khomyakov in the St. George Church of the St. George Monastery in Moscow. They were married by the priest Dmitri Rozhdestvensky. The wedding was celebrated in Moscow style with much fanfare. A. I. Turgenev wrote to P. A. Vyazemsky. Khomyakov's wedding lasted two evenings".

After her marriage, Ekaterina did not break off relations with the Yazykov family. Among her other siblings, she was particularly close to her brother Nicolai, who was a friend of A. S. Khomyakov. As the older brother, Nicolai felt it was his duty to patronise his younger sister; he supervised her reading, in particular recommending that she read Walter Scott. He also encouraged her to keep a detailed diary. In his opinion, "these exercises should give her an opportunity to develop her style and occupy her mind in a useful way". But, as B. V. Shaposhnikov ironically notes, this diary has not survived, and judging from the letters, it contributed little to "the development of her style".

Thanks to the literary connections of A. S. Khomyakov and N. M. Yazykov, Ekaterina met Pushkin, D. V. Davydov, E. A. Baratynsky. In a letter to her brother Nicolai dated 19 May 1836, she wrote: "Pushkin, whom I saw on Friday in Sverbeevs, enchanted me decisively..." The meeting with Pushkin took place on 14 May. They met a second time at the Sverbeyevs' on 15 May.

Pushkin and Yazykov expected to meet at Khomyakov's wedding. Ekaterina Mikhailovna wrote to her brother about her conversation with Pushkin: "...almost talked about you all evening and certainly promised to get you drunk at the wedding", but Yazykov fell ill and Pushkin lost himself in his own troubles.

Ekaterina Mikhailovna wrote to her brother Nicolai about her happiness: "On Saturday we are going to New Jerusalem. Sverbeyev, Pavlov, Androsov, Baratynsky and, of course, Khomyakov. What can I say about the last one? I am too pleased with him. He loves me hardly more than I love him, and, my dear Wessel, I am happy". (Note: Wessel was Nikolai's name in the Yazykov family circle; Catherine was Cato, Kotel; Praskovia was Pikot, etc.) Nicolai, for his part, was happy for his younger sister and his friend. He wrote to his elder sister Praskovya: "...I don't know how to thank you! And she herself is so happy, so happy that I reread her letters every day: they are so beautiful, fresh, full of thought and the soul of Katusha. They're just lovely. By God, she is worthy of her happiness. Even before their marriage, in 1835, he dedicated a fragment of his poem Prayer to her. In general, Nicolai Yazykov's affection for his younger sister left a luminous mark on his writing.

=== Khomyakov family ===
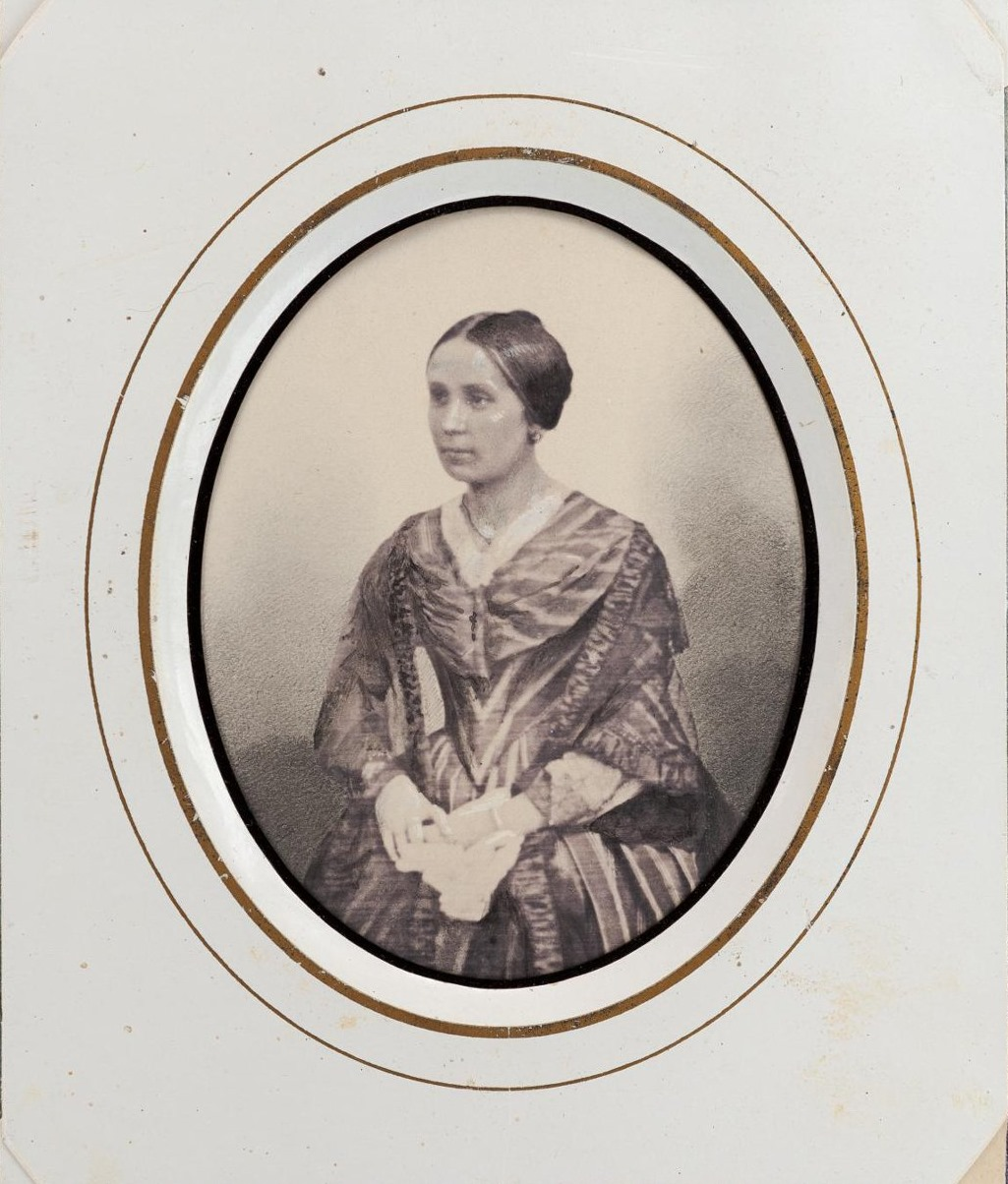
Khomyakova E. M. About 1850 (rep. from a daguerreotype, 1850s)

This marriage was a happy one. The couple had a succession of children. (Note: Stepan (1837-18.02.1838), Fyodor (23.05.1838-), Maria (1840–1919) became the keeper of the Khomyakov archives, which in the 1920s formed the basis of the "Museum of the 1840s" in the house on Dog's Square, Dmitry (1841–1919) became a zemstvo worker, publicist, Ekaterina (b. 24.05.1843-1916? ) was the founder of the Holy Trinity Serafimovsky convent in Kabardino-Balkaria, unmarried, Anna (1844–1928) was the wife of Major General Count M. P. Grabbe, who died in 1818. Grabbe, who died in 1877 in a battle with the Turks, Sophia (1846–1902), unmarried, Olga (1848–1932), wife of the son of the Privy Councillor M. N. Chelishchev (1818–1883), Alexei Mikhailovich (1847–1889). In 1919 their daughter Maria Alekseevna Chelishcheva (1886–1973) became the wife of Count N. A. Bobrinsky. And son Nikolay (1850–1925) - chairman of the III State Duma.) By 1850 there were already nine, and the family idyll was broken only by the death of the first two sons, Stepan and Fyodor, from diphtheria (according to other sources, from scarlatina), (Note: A. S. Khomyakov's poem To Children ("It happened once, in the deep midnight hour...", 1839) was written about this event.) who died on the same day at the end of October 1838. Ekaterina Mikhailovna immersed herself in the household and the children's education, while fully sharing her husband's beliefs and being a reliable support for him in all family matters.

Ekaterina Mikhailovna was an obedient daughter-in-law to her imperious and energetic mother-in-law, Maria Alekseevna Khomyakova, whose wayward character caused her a lot of trouble. To Alexei Stepanovich, she was embodiment of the ideal wife. While in his youth A.S. Khomyakov's spiritual ideal had been his mother, later this role passed to Ekaterina Mikhailovna. He admitted being no less devoted to his wife than to his mother. As an admirer of the English language, he called Ekaterina Mikhailovna Kitty at home.

As a thinker, Khomyakov found strength and inspiration for his creative work in his family. The church historian and biographer of A. S. Khomyakov, N. M. Bogolyubov, wrote that in the 1837 poem The Late Lamp was Burning the poet described the influence of his wife on his creative inspiration. A contemporary researcher of Khomyakov's work, V. A. Koshelev, considers this poem to be the most intimate in his lyrical legacy and in its semantics comparable to Boris Pasternak's famous poem Winter's Night: "A candle glowed upon the desk, / A candle glowed...', where the image of the lamp-candle goes back to the Gospel of Matthew.

Outwardly modest and unassuming, Ekaterina Mikhailovna could have been a very ordinary woman. Modern researchers write: "There was nothing sharp about her, nothing that made an impression". She was the embodiment of the ideal woman". V. N. Lyaskovsky —the biographer of A.S. Khomyakov— wrote: "She was good-looking, but not strikingly beautiful; intelligent, but her intelligence was not shouted about; full of intellectual interests and educated, but without any pretensions to scholarship".

Ekaterina Mikhailovna's religious beliefs are revealed in a letter from A. S. Khomyakov to I. S. Aksakov:

One day two ladies were talking all evening about miracles; my late wife, who was present, came back in a bad temper, and when I asked her what she was unhappy about, she told me the whole conversation. I still couldn't understand what made her so unhappy. She replied: 'It seems that they have never noticed how many miracles God is doing inside of us, that they are so concerned about external miracles.

It is still unknown whether Ekaterina Mikhailovna knew that Seraphim of Sarov had been told about her, but the Khomyakov family was always devout, and the Khomyakovs greatly honoured the Venerable Seraphim of Sarov.

M. A. Khomyakov's daughter recalled about her mother: "As long as I remember my mother, in addition to her beauty she had something gentle, simple, clear and childlike in the expression of her face, she had a cheerful character, but without any mockery, and thanks to this the most serious people spoke to her more cordially than even to their friends".

=== The house on the Sobachya Square ===
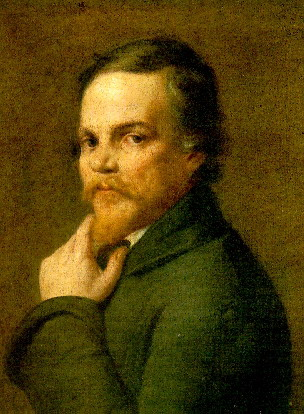
Nicolai Mikhailovich Yazykov. Portrait of E. A. Dmitriev-Mamonov, 1840s

The Khomyakov family lived in a rented flat on the Arbat, in the Nechaeva House, opposite the Nikola Yavleny Church. In 1844 the Khomyakovs bought their own house from Prince B.A. Lobanov-Rostovsky on the corner of Sobachya Square and Nikolopeskovsky Lane, which became "famous for its literary and philosophical salon".

From Ekaterina Mikhailovna's letter we can learn some details: "I bought Princess Lobanova's house in the dog park. I paid 90 thousand rubles for it, but it is a very nice and big house... You can imagine how happy I am. I bought the house, it is nice, I spent almost all my money on it, but there is still something left". An entourage of Moscow Slavophiles soon formed around the Khomyakov family: Aksakovs, Kireyevskys. N. M. Yazykov, M. P. Pogodin, S. P. Shevyryov, Y. F. Samarin, the Sverbeyevs, etc. were also frequent guests. Most of them were connected not only by a spiritual and class community of interests, but also by extensive family ties.

The Kireyevskys were related to Khomyakov's mother, née Kireyevsky. The Sverbeyevs were also related to Khomyakov. The Valuyevs and the Panovs were related to the Yazykovs. The Aksakovs and Samarins were related to both the Khomyakovs and the Yazykovs. Later, P. A. Florensky ironised this rootedness of the Slavophiles in the atmosphere of kinship relations of the cultural nobility: "...they would like to see the whole world organised in a kinship way, as one big tea party of friendly relatives, gathered in the evening to talk about some good subject".

Thanks to his wife's kinship, Khomyakov gained one of his most loyal and diligent followers in the Slavophile doctrine - Dmitri Valuyev. He was Ekaterina Mikhailovna's nephew, the son of her elder sister Alexandra Mikhailovna. The young man was orphaned at an early age and lived first with the Kireyevsky-Yelagins, then with the Sverbeyevs, then with the Khomyakovs. Dmitri was a gifted young man and one of the most ardent Slavophiles of the early generation. Khomyakov had the kindest feelings for him. He treated Dmitri like a son and wrote to him: "Your loving father, A. Khomyakov". Alexei Stepanovich said to N.M. Yazykov: "Valuyev is not only dear, but necessary. He speaks less than all the others, he is almost alone in this".

But Ekaterina Mikhailovna treated her nephew differently. She said that Dmitry tortured her translations for the Library of Education, asking her three times a day if she was working (the Library of Education was founded by Valuyev in 1843). Ekaterina Mikhailovna was also unhappy that her nephew had completely torn her husband away from poetry, while D.A. Valuyev accused Khomyakov of working too little and wasting his energy on trifles instead of finishing the Notes on World History. But his activity was short-lived, he died at the end of 1845.

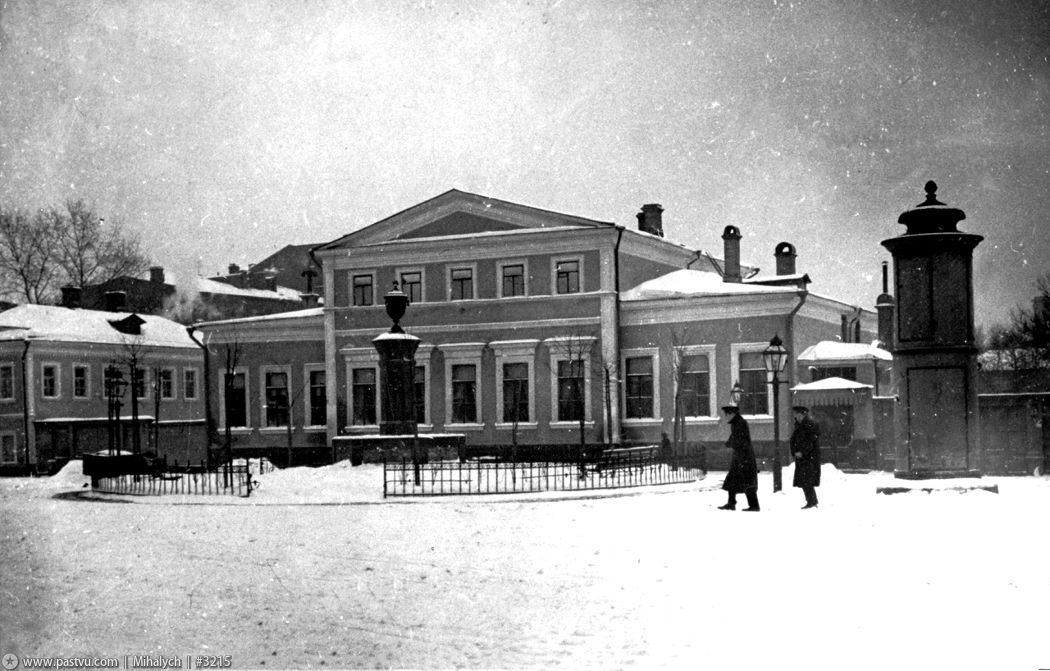
The Khomyakov family lived in the ancestral house on Sobachya Square until 1918, when the building was handed over to a museum

Ekaterina Mikhailovna's cautious attitude to her husband's poetry has been preserved in the Khomyakov family legend. The poet's great-granddaughter, Anastasia Georgievna Shatilova, told V.A. Koshelev that Alexei Stepanovich used to throw newly written poems into the rubbish bin straight away. When E.M. Khomyakova found out about this strange peculiarity of her husband's, she ordered that the basket be brought to her for inspection before it was emptied. It should be remembered, writes the researcher, that the history of literature owes the preservation of some of his poems to his wife's vigilance. He did not throw away the poem To the Children, dedicated to the death of their first-born children, Stepan and Fyodor, but simply did not show it to anyone. A year after writing it, he showed it to Ekaterina Mikhailovna, who was so enthusiastic about it that she sent a copy to her brother; thus the poem To the Children became famous and was considered one of the best examples of "spiritual poetry".

In letters to friends, Khomyakov called Ekaterina Mikhailovna his secretary, but B. V. Shaposhnikov believed that her secretarial powers did not extend to her husband's literary activities and were limited to correspondence with relatives 'on all matters and trends of society'. He also included the translation work of E. M. Khomyakova for the Slavophile editions of D. A. Valuyev. The day of the reception at the Khomyakovs' house was set for Tuesday. O. M. Bodyansky in his memoirs later called Khomyakov's wife a common friend of all Gogol's friends. Gogol scholar V. A. Voropaev believes that "Ekaterina Mikhailovna was an invisible centre of the spiritual life of the Moscow Slavophile community. This was confirmed by Gogol's behaviour during her illness and death".

Daughter Olga recalled in 1922 that the Khomyakov house had a large staff of nannies, governesses and maids, with Khomyakov's mother having her own maid and assistants, and Ekaterina Mikhailovna her own. The whole estate consisted of five buildings. The main mansion had a total area of 84 square sazhens. Its facade faced the Sobornaya Square. A large family of the Khomyakovs lived here. Other buildings were rented. In addition to the residential buildings, there were outbuildings: a pantry, a greenhouse, a garden, etc.

=== Countryside life ===
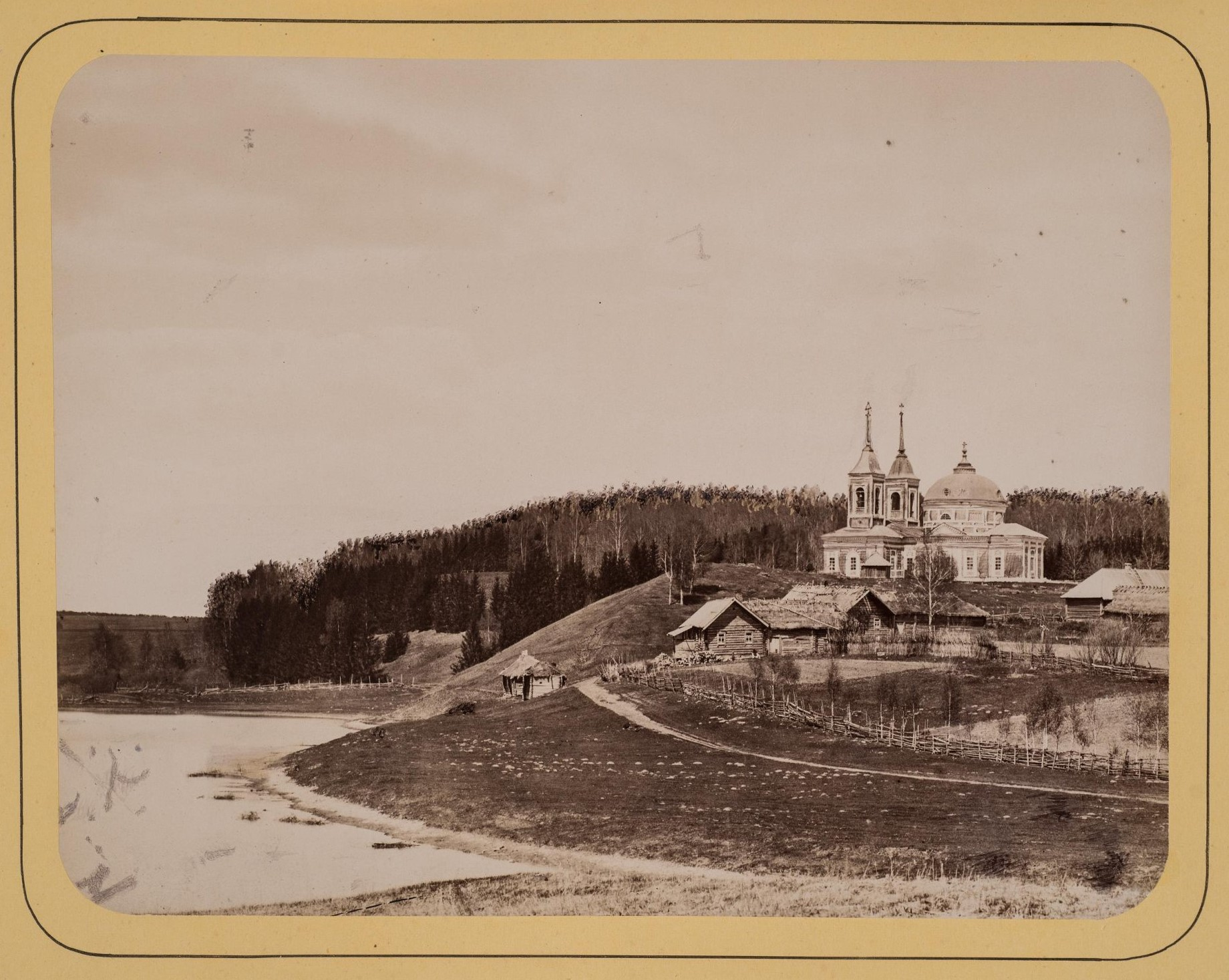
Church of the Transfiguration in the Lipitsy estate. Photo from the 1880s

In addition to the Moscow house, the Khomyakovs owned the Bogucharovo estate in Tula and the Lipitsy estate (now Lipetsy). Lipitsy became their favourite retreat. On 19 October 1842, Khomyakov wrote to his wife: "What beautiful weather, how clear, how quiet, how sunny! The river is frozen and almost completely covered with ice, pure and transparent, like English crystal; the sun during the day and the month at night so and cast it in silver and gold, and in the middle of the stream runs blue, blue, like Alpine lakes... Here you would admire your Lipitsy! Perfect Georgia! After his wife's death, Khomyakov recalled Lipitsy in a letter to Y. F. Samarin: Katya loved it even more than I did; she said she would not give it up for Richmond, which was her favourite place abroad" (Ekaterina Mikhailovna was travelling with her husband in Germany, France and Great Britain in the summer of 1847).

They also visited the North Caucasus, Kislovodsk, many times on holiday. Their daughter Ekaterina Alekseevna later founded the Holy Trinity Serafimovsky convent near Pyatigorsk in 1907.

=== Legacy ===
The preserved correspondence of Ekaterina Mikhailovna includes 779 letters to brothers, sisters and other relatives. Of these, only a small number of letters of historical and literary interest have been published. The rest of the letters are devoted to Ekaterina Mikhailovna's everyday life, and references to major figures in the history of Russian culture are incidental. Excerpts of her letters dedicated to N. V. Gogol were published in 1952 in the 58th volume of Literary Heritage — Pushkin. Lermontov. Gogol.

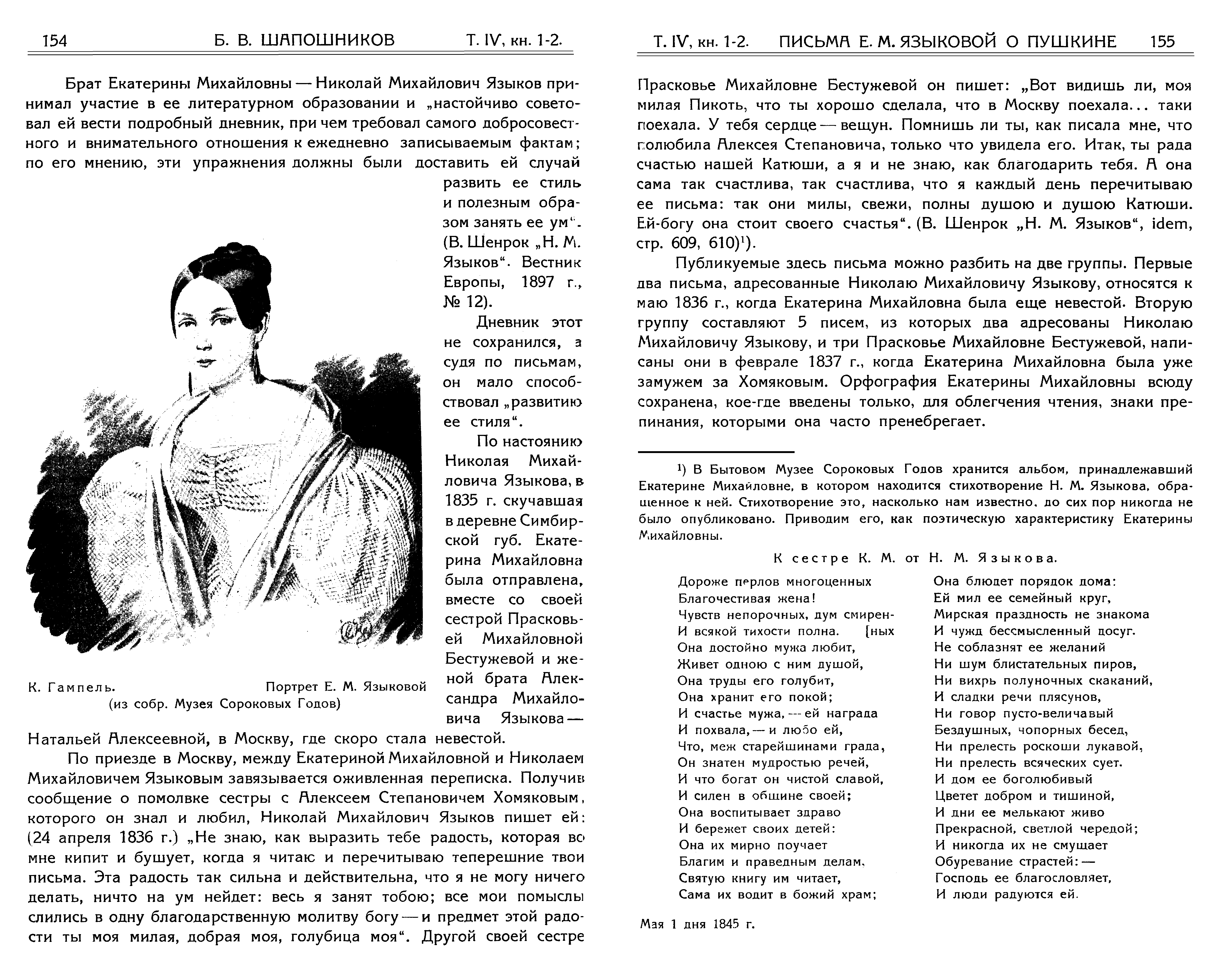
E. M. Khomyakova's letters in the journal Iskusstvo

Letters about A. S. Pushkin were published in full in the journal Iskusstvo in 1928. The director of Moscow's Museum of Household Culture of the 1840s, B. V. Shaposhnikov, wrote that although Khomyakova spent her entire life surrounded by poets, writers and public figures, in his opinion she did not play a prominent role in the society that surrounded her.

For Shaposhnikov, a Pushkin scholar and art historian, Khomyakova's letters were interesting not because they revealed an unknown side of the poet, but because, in his opinion, everything connected with Pushkin in one way or another has an enduring value in the history of culture. Shaposhnikov published seven of Khomyakova's letters. He was particularly interested in the reactions of Moskvoretskiye citizens to Pushkin's death, about which Ekaterina wrote with disapproval: "My for Moskvoretskiye aunts are angry, how could G[osudar] do so much for his family. It is not worth it, they say, he is a godless man, he was never converted in his life, and what he wrote nobody knows".

After the revolution, Ekaterina Mikhailovna's letters became part of the Museum of the 1840', opened on the initiative of the Khomyakovs' daughter Maria Alekseevna (1840–1919), who died shortly afterwards. From 1919 to 1929 the museum was located in the building of the Khomyakovs' ancestral home on Dog's Square. In 1929 the exhibits of the museum, including the letters of E. M. Khomyakova, were transferred to the State Historical Museum, and the museum in the Khomyakov house ceased to exist.

E. M. Khomyakova's album with poems by N. M. Yazykov and other poets has been preserved. M. Khomyakova's album with poems by N. M. Yazykov and other poets; the album contains a caricature of N. V. Gogol by an unknown artist.

== Friendship with N. V. Gogol ==
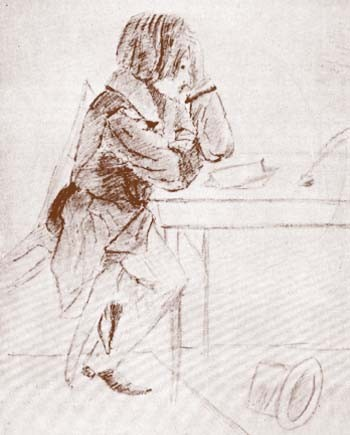
N. V. Gogol. Caricature in the album E. M. Khomyakova. Unknown artist. 1840s

The Yazykov family loved Gogol's work even before they met him in person. N.M. Yazykov wrote to his sisters Ekaterina and Praskovya in Repyevka from Yazykovo on 28 June 1835: "I am very glad that you like Gogol's novels — they are wonderful! God grant him good health, he alone will be more important than all modern French literature, even more than Balzac! I don't like Balzac. We are talking about the novels of the collection Mirgorod, which the Yazykov brothers read. Nicolai Yazykov first met Gogol in 1839, and Ekaterina in 1840. From Gogol's letter to Yazykov dated 10 February 1842 we can learn about his attitude towards the Khomyakov family: "I love them, I rest my soul spending time with them".

On the other hand, Gogol had known the Yazykov family since the mid-1830s. In 1835 Gogol met Lyudmila Dmitrievna Kozhina, née Yazykova, at a Moscow literary salon (she was a cousin of the poet N. M. Yazykov). She was often visited by V. A. Zhukovsky, V. F. Odoevsky and M. S. Schepkin.

According to some reports, when Gogol arrived in Moscow in 1835, he read the newly completed Mirgorod and Arabesques at the Yazykov-Kozhiny house.

After meeting Ekaterina Mikhailovna, the writer became very attached to her. Gogol loved Khomyakova as the wife of his companion and as the sister of Yazykov. The first biographer of Nicolai Gogol, P. A. Kulish, said that "Gogol loved her <...> as one of the most worthy women he met in life". For her part, Ekaterina Mikhailovna wrote to her brother from Moscow on 16 November 1841: 'Today I had Gogol. <...> told me a lot about you, and everything is happy; it is fun to hear how he loves you, I loved him very much. <...> we want to be friends".

In another letter of 1841, Ekaterina Mikhailovna wrote: "I love Gogol: he is very kind and loves his sisters, cares for them. <...> Everyone here attacks Gogol, saying that, listening to his conversation, one cannot assume anything extraordinary in him; Ivan Vasilyevich Kireevsky said that it is almost impossible to talk to him: he is empty. It makes me very angry. They have who does not shout, he is a fool". In a letter to his brother in the spring of 1842, she wrote: "On the third day Gogol came to dine with us. I am very fond of him: he is not as deep as others, and that makes his company much more cheerful".

The writer was forgiven a lot in the house of hospitable hosts. N. M. Yazykov wrote about him: "Gogol is incredibly irritable and self-loving, in a way painful! <...> In Moscow he is only and only with the Khomyakovs. P. I. Bartenev, the editor of the Russky Arkhiv, told me in detail: "Gogol was always at the Khomyakovs' without any notice: he was unbelievably capricious; he would repeatedly order a glass of tea to be brought and taken away, and it would not be poured to his liking: the tea was too hot, too strong, too diluted, the glass was too full, or the opposite. Gogol was angry that too little was served. In short, those present felt uncomfortable; they could only marvel at the patience of the hosts and the extreme indecency of the guest. V. V. Veresaev found the explanation in the fact that Gogol knew how to remain a grateful friend. He pays the bill of friendship with the best he has in him — his hidden goodness".

Gogol's unpredictable behaviour did not overshadow the writer's friendship with the Khomyakovs. Ekaterina Mikhailovna wrote to her brother: "In general, it is difficult to be nicer and kinder than Gogol. I love him because of his friendship with you, and I love him because it is almost impossible not to love him. <He has even seen my little ones; Masha, who calls him nothing but Gogol-Mogol, loves him more than others". Е. M. Khomyakova, along with other friends of the writer and married ladies (A. P. Elagina, E. A. Sverbeyeva and E. G. Chertkova), was one of the guests at Gogol's birthday party, which he had arranged on 9 May 1842 at the house of M. P. Pogodin.

Having left Russia in 1842, Gogol was not able to return to his homeland until 1848, but before he returned to Moscow, the Khomyakovs met him in Germany. On their way to England on 13/25 July 1847, they saw each other in Frankfurt am Main, and on their way back to Russia from England in mid-August of the same year, they met in Ostend. Gogol's Slavophile friends, aware of the writer's attitude towards the Khomyakovs, tried to use their influence on the writer and to obtain from him in a roundabout way what could not be achieved directly. Thus F. V. Chizhov wrote to Ekaterina Mikhailovna, asking her to interest Govoroval in his work through A. S. Khomyakov. S. Khomyakov to interest Gogol in publishing a new Slavophile journal.

Ekaterina Mikhailovna was one of the few people to whom Gogol told of his intention to visit Jerusalem next year. Ekaterina Mikhailovna Khomyakova's daughter, Maria Alekseevna, later said that, according to her father, Gogol, who did not like to talk about his trip to the Holy Land, only told her "what he felt there". P. I. Bartenev, who often saw Gogol at the Khomyakovs' house, reported: "Mostly he went to talk to Ekaterina Mikhailovna, whose virtues he appreciated highly".

The writer became the godfather of the last son of the Khomyakovs, Kolya — the future chairman of the State Duma of the III convocation, Nicolai Alekseevich Khomyakov, born on 19 January 1850. He was named in honour of Ekaterina Mikhailovna's brother, Nicolai, who died in 1846.

The untimely death of E. M. Khomyakova was partly perceived by Gogol as retribution for his own transgressions. The shock of losing Ekaterina Mikhailovna was one of the reasons for beginning a fast. The writer's massive spiritual crisis ended with the burning of manuscripts of his works and his death from exhaustion.

== Disease and death ==
А. A. Kara-Murza recounts the following episode from the apparently untroubled life of the Khomyakov family. In the summer of 1850, Alexei Stepanovich lost his wedding ring in Bogucharovsky Pond. He ordered the water to be dredged to find the ring, but the ring was not found. Ekaterina Mikhailovna, being superstitious, took the loss of the ring as a bad omen and worried about her husband. Nothing special happened to him, but a year and a half later she caught a cold, a complication in the form of typhoid. The disease progressed rapidly: Ekaterina Mikhailovna was ill for several days and died suddenly on 26 January 1852 at the age of 34. As she was pregnant again at the time, her death took two lives at once.

Not much is known about the history of E.M. Khomyakova's illness. Vera Sergeevna Aksakov, daughter of Sergei Timofeyevich Aksakov, wrote to Gogol's mother about her son's last days: "After half of January (1852) <...> we found him quite awake; but at that time Khomyakov's wife, Yazykov's sister, with whom Nicolai Vasilyevich was so friendly, became ill. Ekaterina Mikhailovna was four months pregnant at the time. Different sources state the duration of Khomyakova's illness differently: three days, several days. V.S. Aksakova wrote that everyone was very disturbed and upset by her illness. At some point she seemed to be getting better, and then the Aksakovs set a day for the performance of Little Russian songs — Sunday 27 January. Gogol was to attend and invited O.M. Bodiansky. But the patient's condition deteriorated again, and on Saturday she died.

There was another eyewitness who told about E.M. Khomyakova's illness — Vladimir Ivanovich Khitrovo (1806–1866), a maternal relative of A. S. Khomyakov. According to him, the illness lasted about a week. He wrote:

Suddenly, on the 26th of January, we received a message from Sobornaya Square that Katerina Mikhailovna was dangerously ill: she had caught a cold, had a fever, and had also had a miscarriage, and now she was without hope... Alexei S. Stepanovich had changed so much that he amazed me, he had become an old man of sixty, and he said that there was no hope that Katerina Mikhailovna would live. She has received the Blessed Sacrament and is waiting for the end; she has already begun to rave... she caught a cold while walking in her garden, she got a fever and inflammation in her chest, and now, they say, she is on her last breath. 27th (Sunday). At noon we went to visit the sick woman at the Khomyakovs' house. When we reached the veranda, my heart froze: on the veranda we were told the fatal news that Ekaterina Mikhailovna had died yesterday at 11.30 a.m.!...

Later in his diary, Khitrovo reported that Khomyakov blamed everything on the doctors, who had given calomel to his patient. In Khomyakov's opinion, his wife had died exhausted from premature labour. This was the main cause of death, according to the husband, and not the illness — she died more of exhaustion than of disease itself" (Khomyakov was not a professional doctor, but was interested in homeopathy and cured his serfs). Khomyakov considered Professor A.I. Overa to be directly responsible for his wife's death, while Professors S.I. Klimenkov, A.A. Alfonsky and, above all, P. N. Kildyushevsky advised Overa against calomel treatment. Other guests, however, justified Auvers on the grounds that the inflammation, fever and typhus left the French doctor no choice, and that he himself knew that the risk of aggravating the condition by taking calomel was too great.

N. V. Gogol also attributed Khomyakova's death to the effect of calomel. This was written by a third memoirist, Dr A. T. Tarasenkov, who was not a direct witness of Khomyakova's death, but collected the stories of witnesses of the events that took place in the Khomyakovs' house, so his memoir differs in inaccuracies:

In February <in January> <N. M. > Yazykov's sister, Mrs Khomyakova, with whom he was on friendly terms, fell ill. Gogol had known her since childhood <since 1840>: her illness troubled him. He visited her often, and when she was already in danger, Dr Alfonsky was asked in front of him in what state he found her; he replied with a question: "I hope she has not been given calomel, which might ruin her? But Gogol knew that she had already been given calomel. He ran to the Count and said in an angry voice: "It's all over, she will die, they have given her a poisonous medicine! Unfortunately, the patient did indeed die soon after, and the death of someone dear to him hit him hard".

M. I. Davidov, associate professor of the Perm State Medical Academy, spoke about the treatment of E. M. Khomyakova and the pharmacological effect of calomel. According to him, Gogol had a bitter experience of communication with doctors and had a negative attitude towards doctors in general, he consistently evaluated all the doctors' actions negatively. Therefore, when Alfonsky talked to Gogol about calomel, the writer raised the alarm about the poisonous drug in vain. In Davidov's opinion, A. A. Alfonsky, who was a professor of forensic medicine at Moscow University, 'made an inadmissible statement in the presence of the patient's relatives and friends', which was misinterpreted by those around him. Some of them, especially N.V. Gogol, were able to misunderstand his thoughts —which happened— and draw false conclusions about the correctness of the treatment and the qualifications of the doctors. Meanwhile, calomel was often used by 19th century doctors as an antibiotic and laxative without any negative consequences.

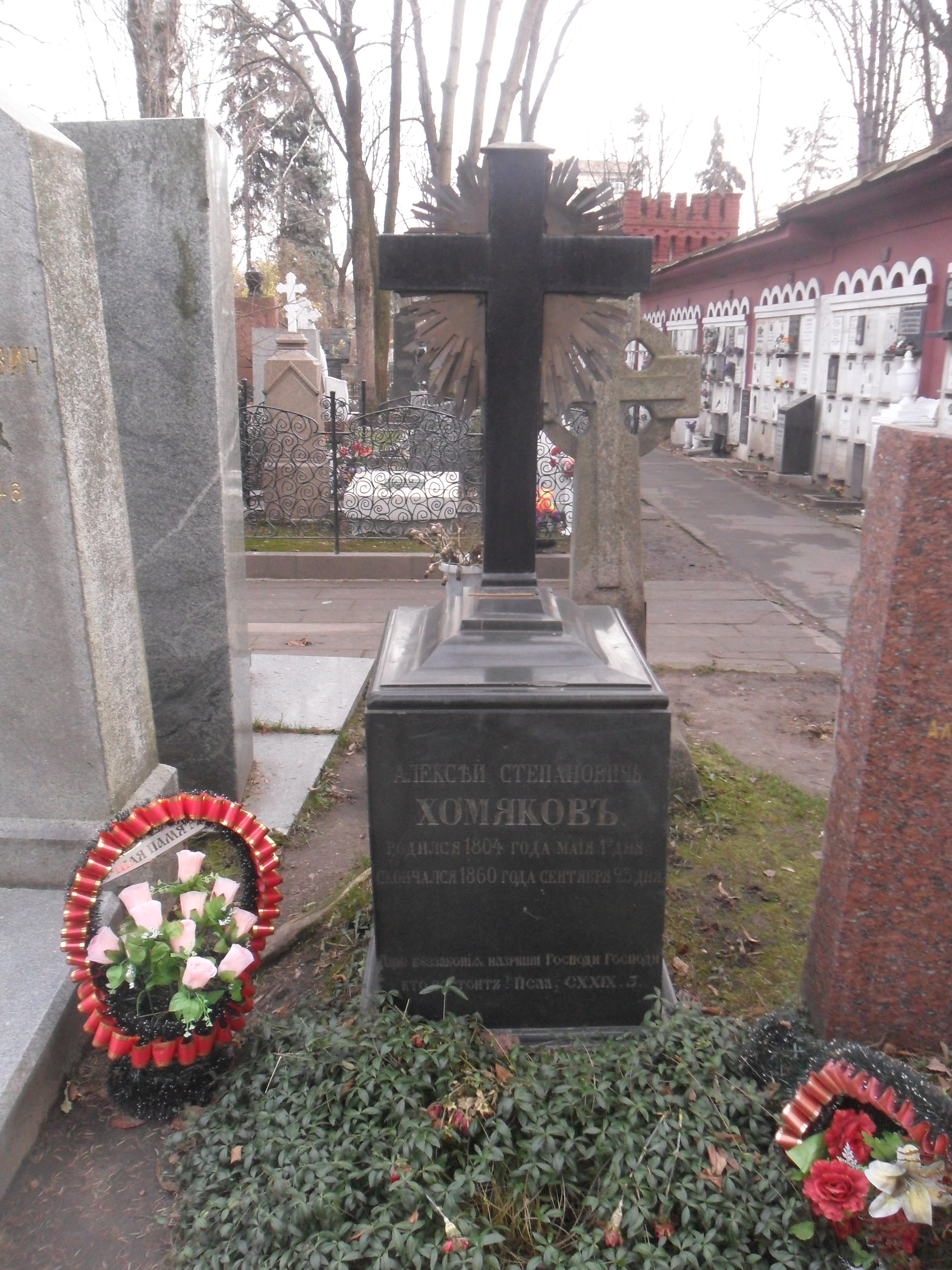
The remains of the Khomyakov couple were reburied in the same grave

A. A. Alfonsky thought differently. In the rarest cases (about 0.5% of patients), the fatal outcome occurs as a result of perforation of peritoneal typhoid ulcers of the small intestine. Intestinal contents spill into the abdominal cavity, causing inflammation of the peritoneum (peritonitis). In this situation, any laxative contributes to increased contraction of the bowel and may therefore provoke perforation, although the likelihood of this is negligible. It is therefore advisable not to use laxatives in peritoneal patients, as Professor Alfonsky somewhat clumsily reported. But perforation can only occur in the late stages of the disease, from about 11 to 25 days after the onset of the disease. In Khomyakova's opinion, according to Davidov, there was no perforation, so there could be no poisoning by the drug, because death occurred at an early stage of the disease, and the immediate cause of death was cardiovascular failure developed as a result of exposure to microbial toxins.

Davidov suggests that, theoretically, typhus from Khomyakova could have infected N. V. Gogol himself. In the winter of 1852, an epidemic of this disease broke out in Moscow. One way or another, the infection took a blossoming young woman to her grave, making the Khomyakov family and the whole society of Moscow Slavophiles unhappy. A funeral service was held in the Khomyakovs' house, in which S. P. Shevyryov took part. P. Shevyryov, D. N. Sverbeyev, A. I. Koshelyov, D. O. Shepping, N. V. Gogol and others. The sister of E. M. Khomyakova came Praskovya Mikhailovna Bestuzheva.

On Tuesday 29 November, Khomyakova's body was buried in the Danilov Monastery, not far from the graves of N. M. Yazykov and D. A. Valuev, E. M. Yazykova's nephew. Later, A. S. Khomyakov, N. V. Gogol, Y. F. Samarin, A. I. Koshelev and F. V. Chizhov were buried there. In 1931 their remains were transferred to the Novodevichy cemetery together with the remains of N. V. Gogol, N. M. Yazykov, A. S. Khomyakov and other figures of Russian culture. The writer V. G. Lidin, who was present at the exhumation of Khomyakova's body, testified that "a turtle comb was stuck in her hair, fully preserved as a coiffure".

== A. S. Khomyakov after his wife's death ==
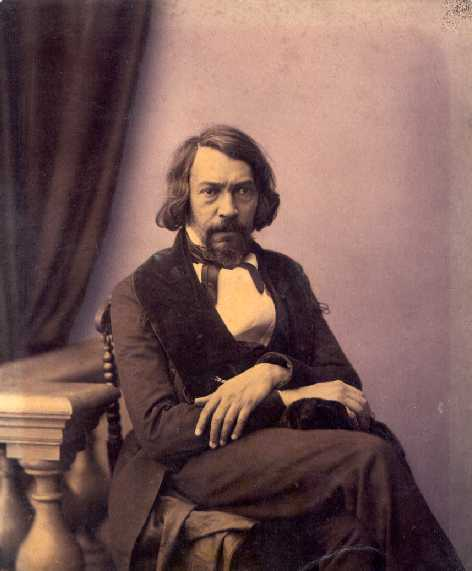
Alexei Khomyakov. Photo from the end of 1850

Alexei Stepanovich was devastated by the sudden death of his wife. He shared his mother's grief, despite the fact that in recent years Khomiakova senior had accused her son of lacking filial love, which, according to V. I. Khitrovo, was due to maternal jealousy: "She wants him to love no one but her". At the funeral, Alexei Stepanovich himself carried the coffin to the grave with relatives and friends. A. P. Elagina reported the death of E. M. Khomyakova to V. A. Zhukovsky:

I arrived in Moscow immediately after the funeral of Khomyakova, with whom we were friends. It is impossible to see Alexei Stepanovich's grief without awe — only a Christian can grieve like that, but God grant him that he may bear it and not fall. — He is deeply grieved, he has changed, he has lost a terrible weight and has turned yellow, but he prays cheerfully and works with all his strength. When he could no longer write, he reread what he had written or painted a portrait of the deceased in oils. He listens to all the services, morning and evening, and he is also busy with the children, but they are so young! They jumped around their mother's coffin, they were happy to see her dressed up, and they say that she flies with and around God.

For a long time after the loss he was unable to come to his senses and take care of the household, which remained in a state of desolation all this time. In a letter to A. D. Bludova in 1855, he wrote that he had been sitting in his corner for more than three years.

His thoughts took a penitential turn. He came to the conclusion "that widowhood is a spiritual monasticism, that it is necessary to live in a more spiritual purity, that is, not to cling in the heart to any woman, but to remain faithful to her until the grave".

Khomyakov remained true to his principles and lived as a widower until the end of his life. Yu. F. Samarin, who was in close contact with Alexei Stepanovich, testified that Khomyakov's life was divided: "During the day he worked, read, talked, went about his business, gave himself to everyone who cared about him. But when night came and everything was quiet around him, another time began for him...". Samarin said that at night Khomyakov prayed for the dead with barely controlled sobs. Alexei Stepanovich told Archbishop Gregory (Postnikov) of Kazan: "The other day, by God's will, in the sixteenth year of our marriage, I buried my wife, young, beautiful, kind, the only love of my life and the greatest happiness that earthly life can give".

A. S. Khomyakov's biographer V. N. Lyaskovsky reported that after his wife's death Khomyakov thought about her incessantly. At that time he liked to paint picturesque portraits of his deceased wife. The poet's heartfelt poem The Resurrection of Lazarus, written in 1852, is dedicated to his wife's death. On 4 June 1912, Khomyakov's poems were set to music by S. V. Rachmaninoff. V. Rachmaninoff. A Romance in F minor with a dedication to F. I. Rachmaninoff. Chaliapin became known as The Resurrection of Lazarus.

Again and again the philosopher's thoughts turned to the causes of Ekaterina Mikhailovna's death. Y. F. Samarin wrote that as soon as he heard about the misfortune of Alexei Stepanovich's family, he left St. Petersburg and came to Moscow to visit his friend. After a pause, Khomyakov was able to tell him the circumstances of the illness and death. Samarin concluded from Khomyakov's explanation that "Ekaterina Mikhailovna died, against all probability, due to a necessary combination of circumstances: he himself clearly understood the cause of the illness and, knowing exactly what means should have helped, he hesitated, contrary to his usual determination, to use them".

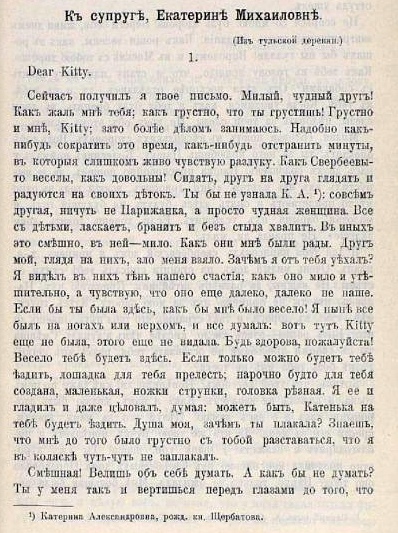
A. S. Khomyakov's letters to his wife are published in Volume 8 of his Collected Works, 1900

According to Samarin's account of Khomyakov's words, she was examined by two doctors. Not having established the true diagnosis, they prescribed the wrong treatment, causing a new illness that led to his wife's death. Khomyakov punished himself for giving in to the doctors and not insisting that the disastrous treatment be stopped. Samarin goes on to say that when he listened to Khomyakov, he objected to him: "Everything seems obvious to him now, because the unfortunate outcome of the disease has justified his fears and at the same time erased from his memory all the other signs on which he himself probably based the hope of recovery". But Khomyakov replied to Samarin: "You have not understood me, I did not mean to say that it was easy to save her. On the contrary, I see with crushing clarity that she must die for me, precisely because there was no reason for her to die. The blow was not aimed at her, but at me. I know that she is better off now than she was here, but I was lost in the fullness of my own happiness".

Khomyakov thus sought spiritual meaning in the death of Ekaterina Mikhailovna: "I know, I am sure, that I needed her death; that it, though a punishment, was at the same time sent to me for correction and so that life, deprived of everything that made it joyful, would be used only for occupations and serious thoughts. Khomyakov executed not only the doctors but also himself. He explained his former self-satisfaction as follows: "It was difficult not to forget, in this abundance of untroubled happiness that I enjoyed. You cannot understand what this life together means. You are too young to appreciate it. But from now on, the philosopher believed, he would suffer the deserved punishment for his idleness: 'Now all the charm of life is lost to me. I cannot enjoy life. <...> All that remains is to learn this lesson. Thanks to God, now it will not be necessary to remind myself of death; it will be with me inseparably to the end".

In another passage he wrote of his irreparable loss: "I owe much to my late Katenka, and I often hear inner reproaches that I have not yet developed and am not developing all the inheritance of spiritual goodness that I received from her".

The death of Ekaterina Mikhailovna radically changed Khomyakov's life. He could no longer easily be carried away by random and varied activities that were not his direct vocation. He retained his usual sociability and affability, but always kept the memory of his beloved wife alive. All his major theological works were written after her death.

== Gogol's grief process ==
N. V. Gogol took the death of Ekaterina Mikhailovna harder than anyone else. Dr Tarasenkov noted that 'her death did not so much affect her husband and relatives as it did Gogol... Here, perhaps for the first time, he saw death face to face..." In fact, it was not the first death Gogol had to face. The writer experienced a similar mental trauma after the death of his beloved Alexander Pushkin in 1837. In 1839, literally in Gogol's arms, the young Joseph Mikhailovich Vielgorsky died, whose relationship with Gogol inspired the work Nights at the Villa. The writer had just suffered the loss of his friend N. M. Yazykov, who died on the eve of 1847. But none of the previous losses had such fatal consequences as the death of E.M. Khomyakova. Dr Tarasenkov's comparison is based on the fact that if Khomyakov could somehow restrain himself and hide his feelings, Gogol indiscriminately gave in to the feeling of grief. In recent years, the writer's fear of death had only increased, and Khomyakova's death only aggravated his earlier depression.

- Khomyakova's death "somehow shook Gogol. He saw it as an omen for himself". The events since 26 January are often recounted by Gogol scholars in the form of a chronology, and their order differs slightly:
- On 24 January (or 25 January) Gogol is visited by O. M. Bodiansky and finds the writer "very energetic". The friends agree to meet on the 27th at O. F. Kosheleva's for a musical evening in honour of the Malorussian song.
- Saturday, 26 January. Death of E.M. Khomyakova. Gogol later confessed to the Aksakov sisters that "he was afraid to inquire about her health that day and only waited for a message from the Khomyakovs, which did not come slowly".
- Monday, 28 January. The first funeral service at the Khomyakovs' house (from the words of V. I. Khitrovo) Gogol could barely stand the service until the end, trying not to look at the deceased. After the funeral he said to Khomyakov: "It's all over for me"; to S. P. Shevyryov: "Nothing can be more solemn than death. Life would not be so beautiful if there were no death". Gogol went to the Aksakov sisters to find out where E.M. Khomyakova was to be buried. When he found out that she was to be buried next to her brother N. M. Yazykov in the Danilov Convent, he "shook his head, said something about Yazykov, and thought so much that we were afraid: he seemed to be completely carried away by his thoughts there, and remained in the same position for so long that we deliberately talked about something else to interrupt his thoughts".
- Tuesday, 29 January. Khomyakova's funeral at the Danilov Convent. Gogol did not attend, claiming indisposition. V. A. Voropaev suggests that it was on this day that Gogol went to the Preobrazhenskaya Hospital to see the famous yurodivy I. Y. Koreisha, and not after 7 February, as Dr. A. T. Tarasenkov wrote, because the writer found no spiritual support in anyone else, and "the desire to meet the yurodivy was perhaps more important to him than Khomyakova's funeral".
- Wednesday, 30 January. Gogol held a second funeral service for Khomyakova in the church of Venerable Simeon the Stolpnik on Povarskaya, after which the writer found some mental equilibrium. To Aksakov he said: "I have calmed down now, today I served alone in my parish funeral service for Katerina Mikhailovna; I remembered and all the former friends, and she brought them all so vividly before me as if in gratitude. I was relieved. But the minute of death is terrible. — Why is it terrible?" asked Aksakovs. — Only to be sure of God's mercy for the suffering man, and then it is comforting to think of death", they objected. — Well, you have to ask those who have gone through that minute", — he replied. Apparently, in the church he had visual hallucinations with visions of the poet Yazykov, Joseph Vielgorsky and other dead people", M. I. Davidov remarks.
- Friday, 1 February. After dinner in the parish church Gogol visited the Aksakovs again, and Vera Aksakova recalled that under the impression of the service of the priest Alexei Sokolov (later the provost of the Cathedral of Christ the Saviour) "all his thoughts were directed to this world". The conversation turned to Alexei Stepanovich, whom Vera Sergeyevna reproached for going out into the world and "because many will say that he did not love his wife". But Gogol objected: "No, not because, but because he should have used these days for other things; <...> he should read the Psalms now, it would be a comfort to him and to his wife's soul".
- Sunday, 3 February. After dinner at the Aksakovs' again, he spoke on the Psalms. "Whenever I go to see you, I pass Khomyakov's house, and every time, both day and night, I see in the window a candle warming in Katerina Mihaylovna's room — the Psalter is being read there."
- Saturday, 9 February. He went to A.S. Khomyakov to console him after the loss of his wife, and plays with his godson as if to say goodbye. Gogol had not been to Khomyakov's since the first funeral of the deceased, that is, since 27 or 28 January. Every day he passed their house on his way to church, but he was not at Khomyakov's until 9 February. Vera Aksakova remarked on this occasion: "I think it was too hard for him to go to him". From the next day he did not leave the house at all.

А. S. Khomyakov recalled these days two weeks later: "The death of my wife and my grief shook Gogol to the core; he said that many people he loved with all his soul were dying for him, especially N. M. Yazykov. <...> Since then he was in a kind of nervous disorder, which took on the character of religious madness. He began to pray and starve himself, accusing himself of gluttony"[3]. Dr A. T. Tarasenkov confirms his words: "Constantly engaged in reading books of spiritual content, he liked to think about the end of life, but from that time the thought of death and preparing himself for it seems to have become his dominant thought. He still had the spirit to console the widowed husband, but from then on his inclination to solitude became noticeable; he began to pray longer, to read at his Psalter for the deceased".

Well acquainted with Gogol, P. V. Annenkov recalled: "As for the contemplation of death, it is known how his whole body was affected by the coffin of Mme. Khomyakova, which he himself soon followed into the grave". P. A. Kulish wrote that Gogol viewed Khomyakova's death from his lofty vantage point and reconciled with her only at the coffin of the deceased. "But this did not save his heart from the fatal shock: he felt that he was suffering from the same disease that had killed his father — the fear of death".

According to literary scholar K. V. Mochulsky, Gogol prophetically described his death in the story The Old World Landlords. From an early age, the writer feared the mysterious call "that inevitably follows death". Nicolai Gogol died in the same way as Afanasy Ivanovich Tovstogub, the hero of his story. "He suddenly heard someone behind him say in a rather clear voice: "Afanasy Ivanovich" ... "He submitted to his mental conviction that Pulcheria Ivanovna was calling him: he submitted with the will of an obedient child, dried up, coughed, melted like a candle, and finally died like her, when there was nothing left to support her poor flame". Mochulsky believes that this is an accurate diagnosis of the author's own illness: Gogol died because the dead Khomyakova called him; he too "submitted" and also "melted like a candle".

However, Gogol's historian Yu. V. Mann believes that by the beginning of February the pain of losing Khomyakova had somewhat subsided in Gogol, until there were other circumstances not directly related to Khomyakova's death, namely meetings with Matthew Konstantinovsky and arguments with him in early February about Dead Souls, which did not allow the writer to finally come out of his depression. V. A. Voropaev and N. Urakova point out that the real reason for such an unexpected reaction of Gogol to the death of E.M. Khomyakova will hardly ever be fully unravelled, but one thing remains undeniable: it was the strongest spiritual shock. A. S. Khomyakov experienced a similar spiritual shock, but on a smaller scale. V. Alexeev agrees with this opinion: "You can express your assumptions, fantasise, try to penetrate into the details of the friendship between Khomyakov and Gogol, but all this will be an assumption, the author's own vision".

Watercolour by K. Gampeln, 1830s; work by Sándor Kozin; daguerreotype, 1840s; portrait by A. S. Khomyakov, 1850s

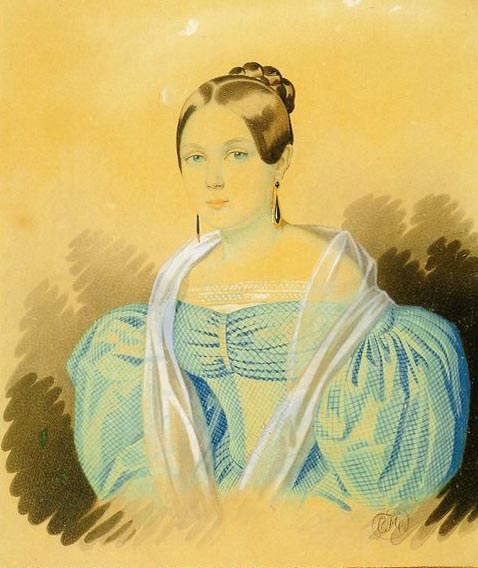

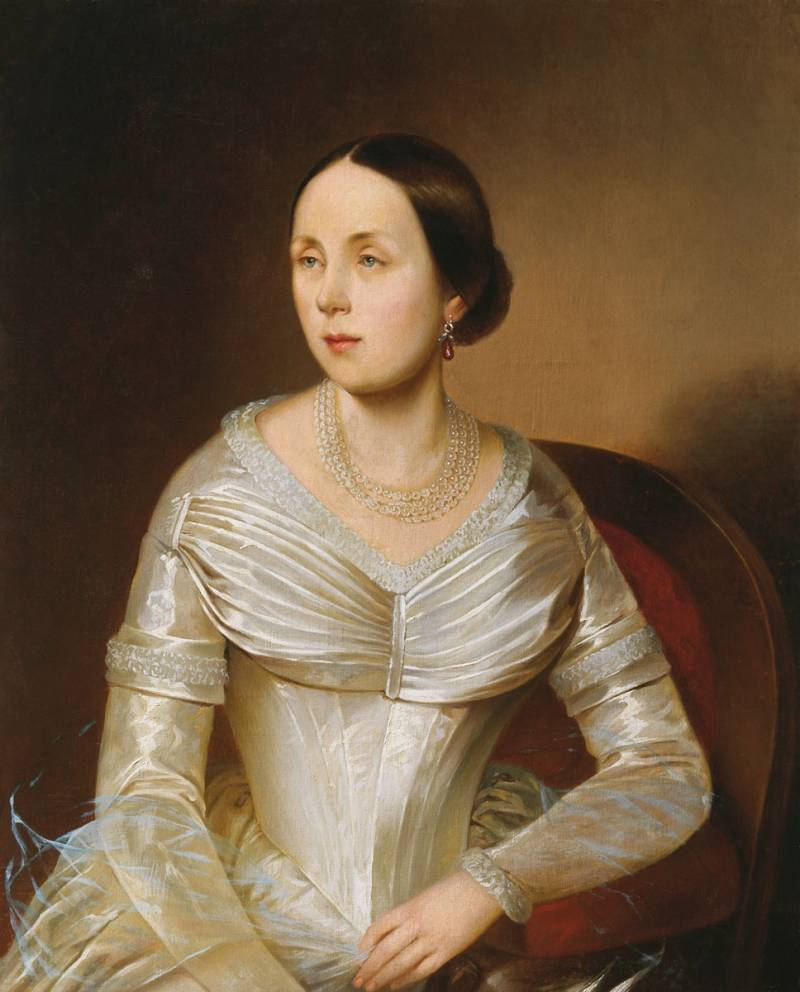

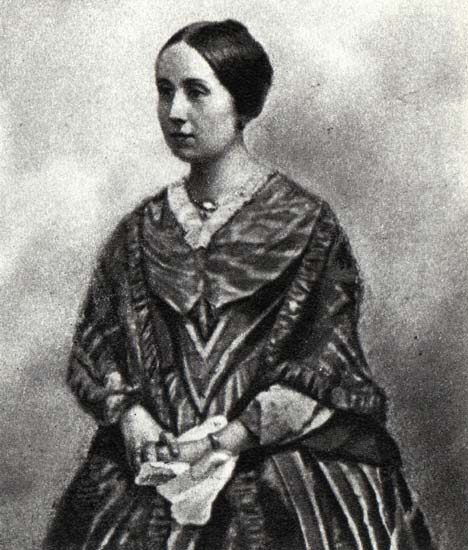

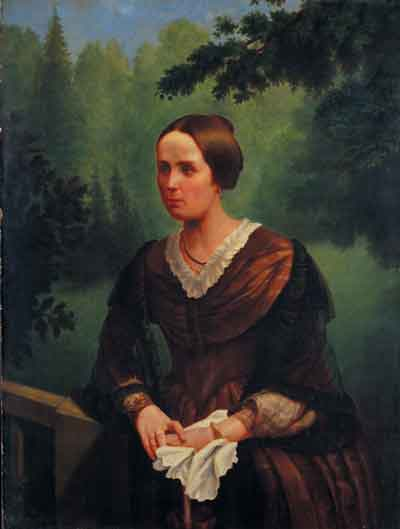

== Bibliography ==
- Kalyaguin, N. (2014). Чтения о русской поэзии. Чтение десятое [Russian poetry reader. Reader ten] (in Russian). М.: ЛитРес. pp. 186–198. ISBN 978-5-457-60449-0.
- Khomyakov, A. S. (2013) [1900]. "Письма к Е. М. Хомяковой". Полное собрание сочинений в восьми томах [Complete Collection of Works in Eight Volumes] (in Russian). Vol. 8. М.: Университетская типография. pp. 11–18. ISBN 978-5-9989-9773-0.
- Shaposhnikov, B. V. (1928). Письма Е. М. Языковой о Пушкине [E. M. Yazykova's letters about Pushkin] (PDF) (in Russian). Vol. IV. М.: Издательство ГАХН. pp. 153–168. Archived from the original (PDF) on 8 February 2015.
