= The Tale of How Ivan Ivanovich Quarreled with Ivan Nikiforovich =

Story by Nikolai Gogol

"The Tale of How Ivan Ivanovich Quarreled with Ivan Nikiforovich" (Russian: «Повесть о том, как поссорился Иван Иванович с Иваном Никифоровичем», romanized: Povest' o tom, kak possorilsja Ivan Ivanovič s Ivanom Nikiforovičem, 1835), also known in English as The Squabble, is the final tale in the Mirgorod collection by Nikolai Gogol. It is known as one of his most humorous stories.

== Plot summary ==
The Squabble

This story takes place in the bucolic small town of Mirgorod. It is written in a style featuring grotesque yet realistic portrayals of the characters. The two Ivans are gentlemen landowners, neighbors, and great friends, each one almost being the opposite image of the other. Ivan Ivanovich is tall, thin, and well-spoken, for example, while Ivan Nikiforovich is short and fat and cuts to the point with a biting honesty.

One day, Ivan Ivanovich notices his friend's servant hanging some clothes out to dry as well as some military implements, especially a Turkish rifle, which interests him. He goes over to Ivan Nikiforovich's house and offers to trade a gray sow and two sacks of oats for it, but his friend is unwilling to part with it and calls Ivan Ivanovich a goose, which terribly offends him. After this, they begin to hate each other.

Ivan Nikiforovich erects a goose pen with two posts resting on Ivan Ivanovich's property, as if to rub in the insult. To retaliate, Ivan Ivanovich saws the legs off in the night and then fears that his former friend is going to burn his house down. Eventually, Ivan Ivanovich goes to the courts with a petition to have Ivan Nikiforovich arrested for his slander. The judge cannot believe what is occurring and tries to convince him to make amends, but he disregards his suggestions and leaves the courthouse.

Shortly after this, Ivan Nikiforovich comes into the court with his own petition, to the amazement of those gathered there. Strangely enough, shortly after Ivan Nikiforovich leaves, the petition is stolen and destroyed by the gray sow belonging to Ivan Ivanovich. The police chief's attempts to arrest the pig and convince Ivan Ivanovich to reconcile with his friend are unsuccessful. Because of the sow, a new petition is filed, which is quickly duplicated and filed within a day but sits in the archives for a couple of years.

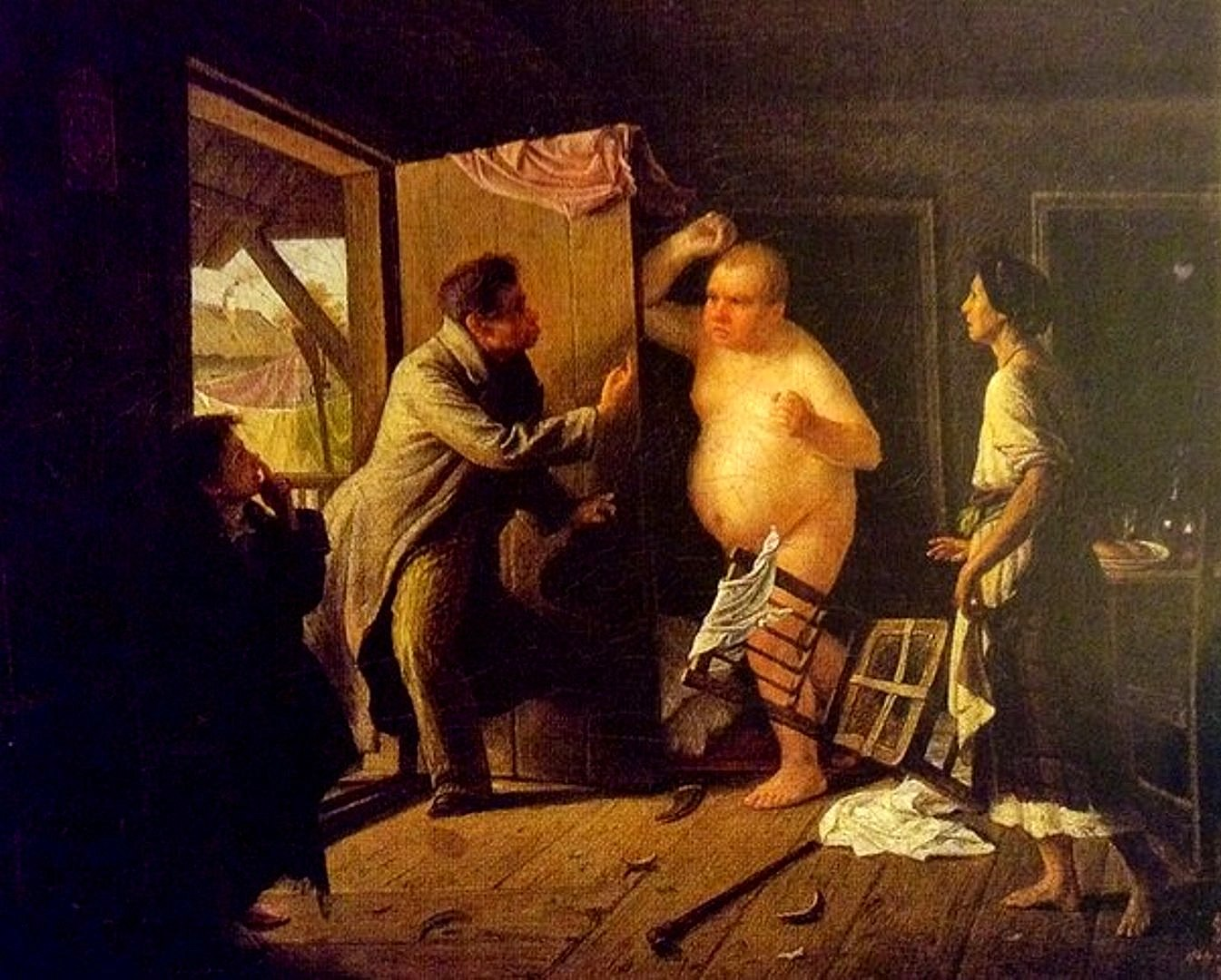
Scene from the story by Sergei Gribkov

Eventually, the police chief has a party that Ivan Ivanovich is attending, but his old friend does not, because neither will go anywhere where the other is present. The party guest Anton Prokofievich goes to Ivan Nikiforovich's house to convince him to come, unknown to Ivan Ivanovich. Anton Prokofievich successfully convinces Ivan Nikiforovich to come, but then both Ivans notice each other sitting across the table and the party grows silent. However, they continue eating with nothing occurring. At the end of dinner, both try to leave without the other noticing, but some of the party members push them towards each other so they make up. They begin to, but Ivan Nikiforovich mentions the word "gander" again, and Ivan Ivanovich storms out of the house.

The narrator returns to Mirgorod many years later and sees the two Ivans again, completely worn out. Each is convinced that their case will be concluded in his favour the following day, and the narrator shakes his head in pity and leaves, stating, "It is a depressing world, gentlemen!"

== Adaptations ==
In March 2002, the BBC Radio 4 comedy series Three Ivans, Two Aunts and an Overcoat adapted the story under the title "The Two Ivans", starring Griff Rhys Jones and Stephen Moore. The adaptation ends with the two Ivans agreeing to fight a duel. Ivan Ivanovich, as the challenged party, has the choice of weapons, so he chooses the Turkish rifle, but the duel degenerates into a struggle for the rifle. It goes off in the struggle, having been overloaded with gunpowder, and the two Ivans are killed. They both go to Heaven, but upon seeing Ivan Ivanovich's outspread wings, Ivan Nikiforovich again calls him a goose, which sets off the squabble all over again.

The story was adapted into a Marathi movie entitled Katha Don Ganpatravanchi in 1996. The movie was directed by Arun Khopkar and written by Satish Alekar and stars Dilip Prabhawalkar and Mohan Agashe.
