= Sergei Gribkov =

Russian painter

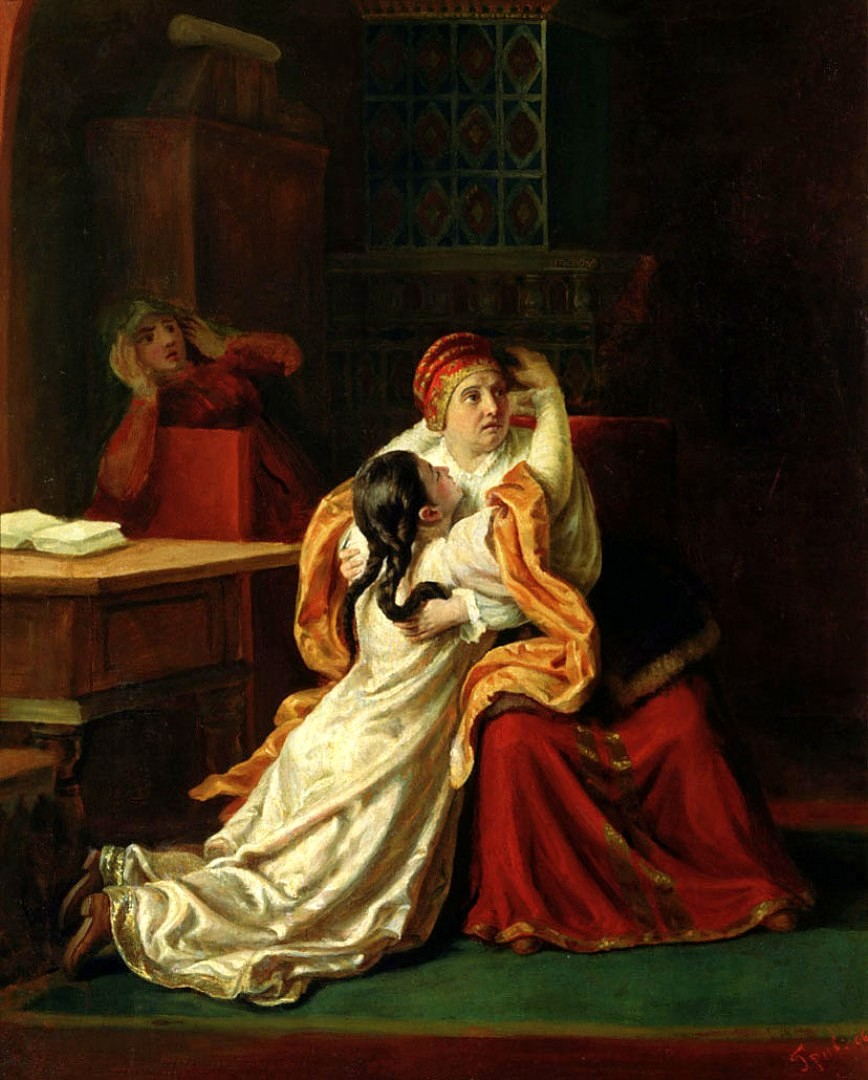
Ksenia Godunova

Sergei Ivanovich Gribkov (Russian: Сергей Иванович Грибков; 4 July 1822, Kasimov - 16 December 1893, Moscow) was a Russian painter of historical and genre scenes in the Realistic style, as well as an iconographer.

== Biography ==
He came from a family of small merchants. Despite his dissatisfaction with the world of business, his artistic career began late, in 1841, when Sergei Stroganov visited Kasimov and chanced to see some of Gribkov's drawings. He was sufficiently impressed to suggest that Gribkov take up art professionally. His father reluctantly agreed and, in 1844, on Stroganov's recommendation, he began studies at the Moscow School of Painting, Sculpture and Architecture with Mikhail Scotti and Apollon Mokritsky.

While at the school, his father demanded evidence that he was making progress. In 1851, his painting of a Spanish woman praying in church brought him a commendation from the governing council of the Moscow Art Society and he was named an "Artist" by the Imperial Academy of Arts.

He remained at the Moscow School until 1856. In 1864, his painting of a scene from The Tale of How Ivan Ivanovich Quarreled with Ivan Nikiforovich, by Gogol, won him first prize in a competition held by the "Moscow Society of Art Lovers".

From 1880 to c.1890, he gave lessons at his private art studio in Moscow and provided what support he could to struggling artists, notably Alexei Savrasov, who was often a guest in Gribkov's home. In 1882, he held a major showing at the "All-Russian Art and Industrial Exhibition" at Khodynka Field.

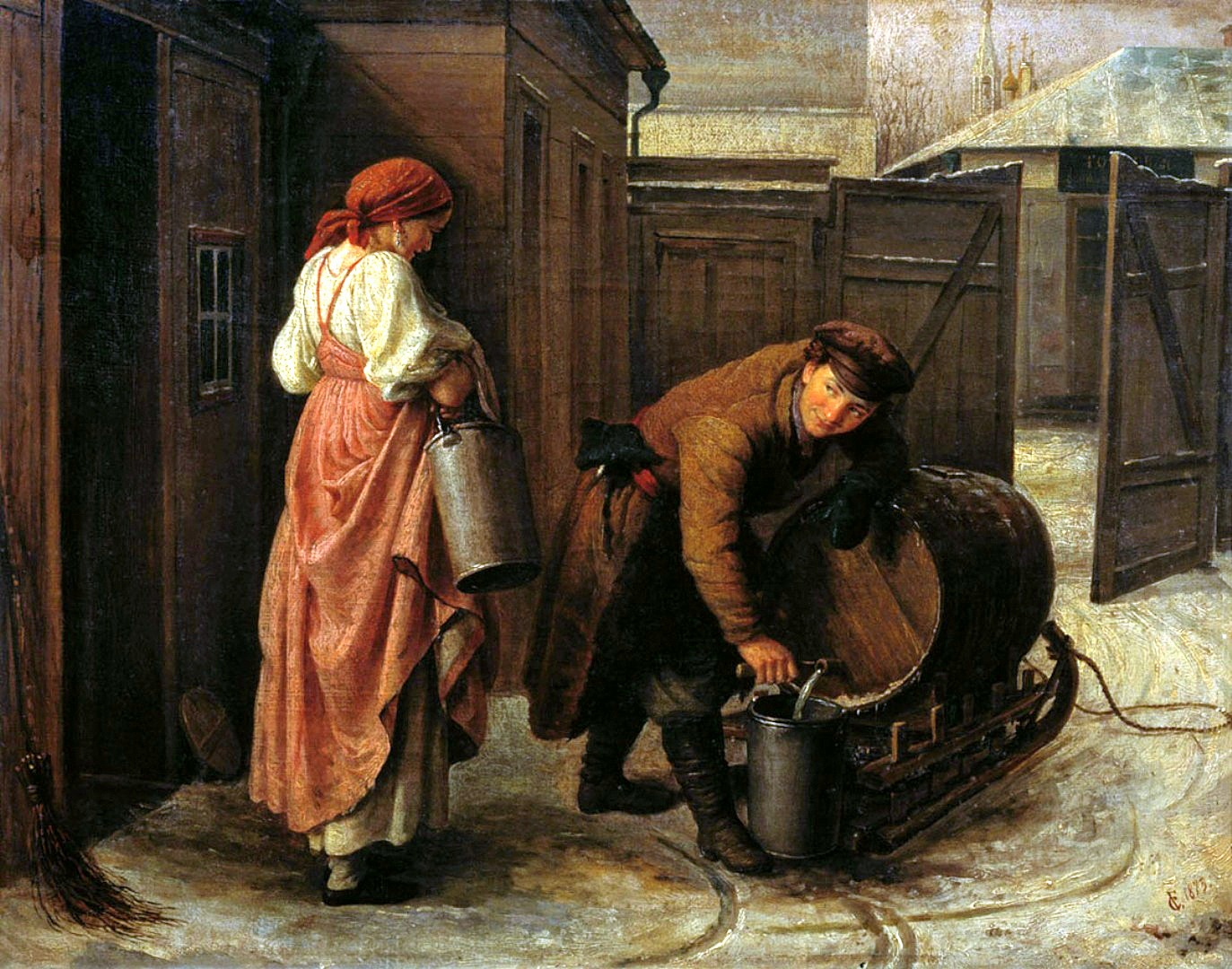
The Water Carrier

During the last years of his life, in addition to his oil paintings, he created murals and frescoes for several churches in Moscow, the Sergiev-Kazan Cathedral in Kursk and Ascension Cathedral in his hometown of Kasimov. He also did murals for Moscow's Catherine Hospital.

According to a newspaper account by Vladimir Gilyarovsky, Gribkov died in poverty and a collection had to be taken up to pay for his funeral.
