= Erika Nyström =

Finnish beach volleyball player (born 1983)

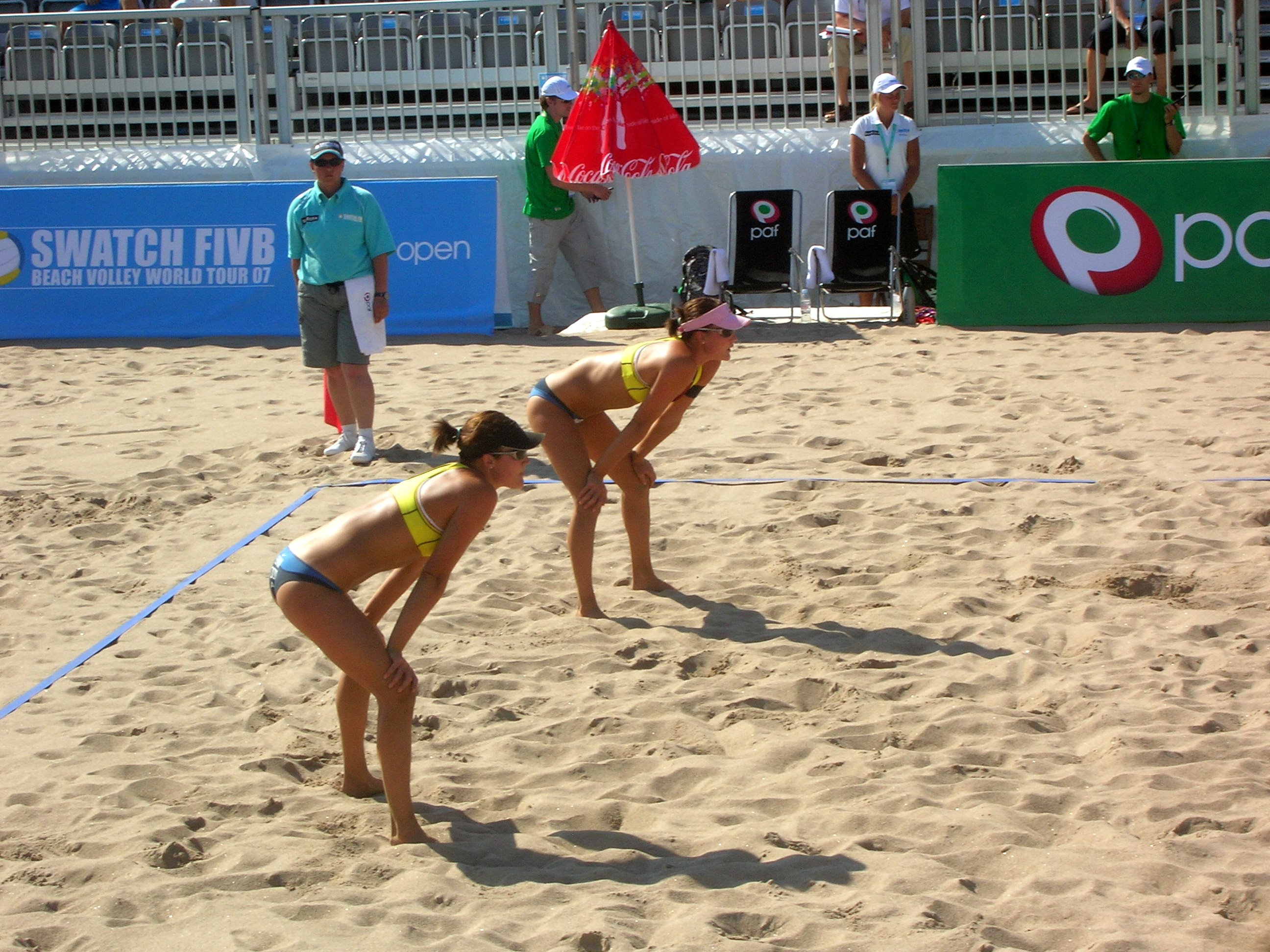
- The Nyström twins at PAF Open 2007 in Mariehamn, Åland. Erika at the left, wearing a black cap.

Personal information
- Nationality: Cypriot and Finnish
- Born: 13 September 1983 (age 43); Jyvaskyla, Finland
- Hometown: Muurame, Finland
- Height: 1.79 m (5 ft 10 in) (2015)
- Weight: 65 kg (143 lb) (2015)
Honours
Women's beach volleyball
Representing Finland
European Championships
Bronze medal – third place	2010 Berlin	Beach

Erika Nyström (born 13 September 1983) is a professional Finnish–Cypriot female beach volleyball player. Her twin sister, Emilia, is also a beach volleyball player. She stands 1.79 m (5 ft 10 in) tall and weighs 65 kg (143 lb). Erika is the first born of the identical twins from Muurame, Finland.

She was scheduled to compete for Cyprus at the 2022 Commonwealth Games, but due to an injury she was replaced by Manolina Konstantinou.
