= Emilia Nyström =

Finnish beach volleyball player (born 1983)

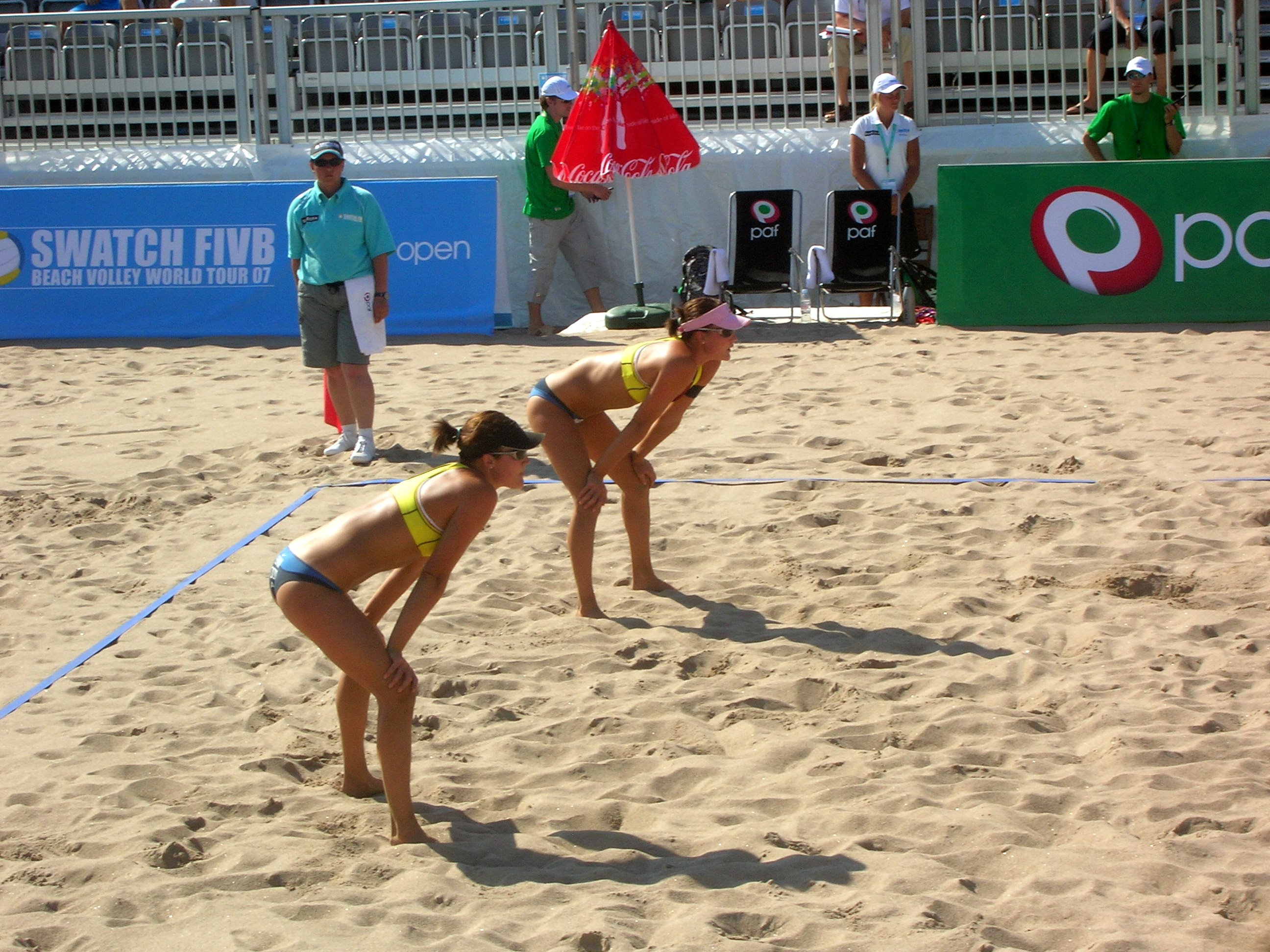
- The Nyström twins at PAF Open 2007 in Mariehamn, Åland. Emilia at the right, wearing a pink cap.

Personal information
- Nationality: Finnish
- Born: 13 September 1983 (age 43); Jyvaskyla, Finland
- Hometown: Muurame, Finland
- Height: 1.77 m (5 ft 10 in) (2015)
- Weight: 66 kg (146 lb) (2015)
Honours
Women's beach volleyball
Representing Finland
European Championships
Bronze medal – third place	2010 Berlin	Beach

Emilia Nyström (born 13 September 1983) is a professional Finnish beach volleyball player together with her twin sister, Erika. She stands 1.77 m (5 ft 10 in) tall and weighs 66 kg (146 lb). Emilia is the last born of the identical twins and they are both from Muurame, Finland.
