= The Old World Landowners =

1835 short story by Nikolai Gogol

"The Old World Landowners" (Russian: Старосветские помещики, romanized: Starosvyetskiye pomeshchiki) is a short story written in 1835 by Nikolai Gogol. It is the first tale in the Mirgorod collection. A bittersweet and ironic reworking of the Baucis and Philemon legend from Ovid's Metamorphoses, it is a simple story that represents the mature Gogol and hints at his later works.

== Plot ==
Gogol opens by providing a romantic description of landowners in the countryside, giving particular attention to minute details. The two landowners, Afanasy Ivanovich Tovstogub and Pulkheriya Ivanovna Tovstogubikha live peacefully together in a remote village. The descriptions of them fit into the Slavophile tradition, comparing them strikingly against urban Little Russians (Ukrainians), particularly in Saint Petersburg, who are referred to as "paltry contemptible creatures" (because they acquire wealth dishonorably and conceal their descent by changing their last names to sound like Great Russians).

The two old landowners live in peace, with a mutual love that brings a sense of sympathy. The bulk of the opening focuses on their day-to-day lives, eating jelly, making jokes and so forth. Eventually, Gogol introduces Pulkheriya’s grey cat, which Afanasy jokes about, wondering why anyone would waste time with such a creature. The cat is introduced with a sense of foreboding, with Gogol commenting that little things can affect the stability of the strongest realities ("a melancholy incident that transformed forever the life of that peaceful nook").

The cat gets away at one point, and Pulkheriya finds it shortly thereafter in a feral state. Though it comes back to her and goes inside the house to be fed, the cat seems strangely different and eventually flees the house to never return. Pulkheriya then sinks into thought, believing that death will soon come for her. She grows ill and weary and dies, leaving Afanasy alone. He progressively breaks down, disturbed by the smallest things for they remind him of Pulkheriya. The entire area he had control over slowly becomes more degraded as his condition worsens, and he himself dies after he believes he hears her calling to him outside.

A distant kinsman from an unknown location, who was a lieutenant, takes over control of the estate, and soon everything falls into ruin. He puts the estate under the care of a board of trustees, bringing things like a fine English sickle to clear the area, and the huts on the property soon fall down, leaving some peasants drunken and hopeless and others to run away to find better lives. The new owner rarely visits the estate, and the story ends commenting on his visits to local markets to buy nothing over a ruble in price.
