= Mirgorod (short story collection) =

Mirgorod (Russian: «Миргород») is a collection of short stories written by Nikolai Gogol, composed between 1832 and 1834 and first published in 1835. It was significantly revised and expanded by Gogol for an 1842 edition of his complete works. The title Mirgorod is the Russian pronunciation of the name of the Ukrainian city Myrhorod and means "city of peace" in both languages. It is also the setting for the final story in the collection, “The Tale of How Ivan Ivanovich Quarreled with Ivan Nikiforovich”. The title reflects the stories’ portrayal of provincial Ukrainian life, similar to Gogol’s successful previous collection, Evenings on a Farm Near Dikanka. To solidify this connection between the two works, he attached the subtitle: “Stories which are a continuation of the Evenings on a Farm Near Dikanka.”

== Stories ==
The collection is a cycle of four stories, divided into two volumes:

Part One

1. "Old World Landowners" («Старосветские помещики»)
2. "Taras Bulba" («Тарас Бульба»)

Part Two

1. "Viy" («Вий»)
2. "The Tale of How Ivan Ivanovich Quarreled with Ivan Nikiforovich" («Повесть о том, как поссорился Иван Иванович с Иваном Никифоровичем»)

== Background ==
The stories in Mirgorod were composed at different times. “Old World Landowners” was begun in 1832 when Gogol revisited his birthplace of Sorochyntsi after living in Saint Petersburg for five years, “Viy” was begun in 1833, and “The Tale of How Ivan Ivanovich Quarreled with Ivan Nikiforovich” had previously appeared in the almanac Housewarming (Новоселье) in 1834. The collection came to completion during Gogol’s ill-fated term as Professor of Medieval History at the University of St. Petersburg in 1834. This period was very productive for Gogol, as he also worked on The Government Inspector and Dead Souls. Neglecting his duties as professor, Gogol wrote to his friend Mikhail Maximovich of his writing, confiding, “I am working like a horse, but on my own things and not on my lectures.”

The two epigraphs that Gogol attaches to Mirgorod reveal his intention to present the stories as a cycle: “Mirgorod is an extremely small town near the Khorol river. It has one rope factory, one brick works, four water mills and forty five windmills” and “Although in Mirgorod bread rings are baked from black dough, they are very tasty,” ostensibly taken from works entitled Zyablovsky’s Geography and Notes of a Traveler respectively. Gogol conceived of the stories as circular like a Mirgorod bread ring, and endeavored to exhaustively display in them the panorama of traditional Ukrainian provincial life.

“The Tale of How Ivan Ivanovich Quarreled with Ivan Nikiforovich” met with disapproval from censors, leading Gogol to pen a preface to the story with thinly veiled contempt for censorship. The preface, however, was also rejected during printing. As a result, Gogol was forced to hastily add two superfluous pages to “Viy” so that the finished bindings of the first edition would still fit.

== Reception ==
Though Mirgorod was not an immediate financial success – to Gogol’s dismay – its contemporary critical reception was very positive. Alexander Pushkin singled out “Old World Landowners” in particular as a “comic touching idyll, which forces us to laugh through tears of sadness and tenderness.” The influential 19th-century Russian critic Vissarion Belinsky highly praised the collection. In the year of its publication he hailed Gogol as the new “head of Russian literature.” Leo Tolstoy read “Viy” as a young man and counted it among the works of literature that left a “tremendous” impression on him.

In his book-length study, Nikolai Gogol, 20th-century novelist Vladimir Nabokov was far harsher. Seeing Mirgorod as a rough precursor to Gogol’s later stories like “The Overcoat” and calling it “juvenilia of the false humorist Gogol,” Nabokov declared: “when I want a good nightmare I imagine Gogol penning in Little Russian dialect volume after volume of Dikanka and Mirgorod stuff about ghosts haunting the banks of the Dnieper, burlesque Jews and dashing Cossacks."

== English translations ==
- 1886: Isabel Florence Hapgood (published by T. J. Crowell & Co.)
- 1928: Constance Garnett (published by Chatto & Windus).
- 1962: David Magarshack (published by Farrar, Straus and Cudahy).
- 1998: Richard Pevear and Larissa Volokhonsky (published by Pantheon Books)
