= 2011 Beach Volleyball World Championships – Women's tournament =

Tournament details
- Host country: Italy
- City: Rome
- Dates: 13 June – 19 June
- Teams: 48 (from 5 confederations)

Final positions
- Champions: Brazil; Larissa França; Juliana Silva (1st title)
- Runners-up: United States; Misty May-Treanor; Kerri Walsh Jennings
- Third place: China; Xue Chen; Zhang Xi
- Fourth place: Czech Republic; Hana Skalníková; Lenka Hajecková

The women's tournament was held from June 13 to 19, 2011 in Rome, Italy.

== Preliminary round ==
Qualified for the Round of 32 as pool winners or runners-up
Qualified for the Round of 32 as one of the best four third-placed teams
Qualified for the Lucky Losers Playoffs
Eliminated

=== Pool A ===
Pos	Team	Pld	W	L	Pts	SW	SL	SR	SPW	SPL	SPR	Qualification
1	(Brazil) Larissa–Juliana	3	3	0	6	6	0	MAX	126	79	1.595	Round of 32
2	(Germany) Köhler–Sude	3	2	1	5	4	2	2.000	116	107	1.084	Round of 32
3	(Netherlands) Kadijk–Mooren	3	1	2	4	2	4	0.500	110	122	0.902	3rd place ranking
4	(Italy) Toth–Benazzi	3	0	3	3	0	6	0.000	83	127	0.654	Eliminated

Date		Score		Set 1	Set 2	Set 3
13 Jun	Köhler–Sude (Germany)	2–0	(Netherlands) Kadijk–Mooren	21–15	22–20	
13 Jun	Larissa–Juliana (Brazil)	2–0	(Italy) Toth–Benazzi	21–7	21–9	
14 Jun	Larissa–Juliana (Brazil)	2–0	(Netherlands) Kadijk–Mooren	21–14	21–18	
14 Jun	Köhler–Sude (Germany)	2–0	(Italy) Toth–Benazzi	21–17	21–13	
15 Jun	Larissa–Juliana (Brazil)	2–0	(Germany) Köhler–Sude	21–15	21–16	
15 Jun	Kadijk–Mooren (Netherlands)	2–0	(Italy) Toth–Benazzi	21–17	22–20	

=== Pool B ===
Pos	Team	Pld	W	L	Pts	SW	SL	SR	SPW	SPL	SPR	Qualification
1	(Brazil) Talita–Antonelli	3	3	0	6	6	0	MAX	126	64	1.969	Round of 32
2	(Russia) Vasina–Vozakova	3	2	1	5	4	3	1.333	124	129	0.961	Round of 32
3	(Spain) Liliana–Baquerizo	3	1	2	4	3	4	0.750	111	116	0.957	3rd place ranking
4	(Mauritius) Li Yuk Lo–Rigobert	3	0	3	3	0	6	0.000	82	134	0.612	Eliminated

Date		Score		Set 1	Set 2	Set 3
13 Jun	Liliana–Baquerizo (Spain)	2–0	(Mauritius) Li Yuk Lo–Rigobert	21–9	21–14	
13 Jun	Talita–Antonelli (Brazil)	2–0	(Russia) Vasina–Vozakova	21–14	21–9	
14 Jun	Vasina–Vozakova (Russia)	2–0	(Mauritius) Li Yuk Lo–Rigobert	21–13	29–27	
14 Jun	Talita–Antonelli (Brazil)	2–0	(Spain) Liliana–Baquerizo	21–9	21–13	
15 Jun	Liliana–Baquerizo (Spain)	1–2	(Russia) Vasina–Vozakova	21–15	13–21	13–15
15 Jun	Talita–Antonelli (Brazil)	2–0	(Mauritius) Li Yuk Lo–Rigobert	21–7	21–12	

=== Pool C ===
Pos	Team	Pld	W	L	Pts	SW	SL	SR	SPW	SPL	SPR	Qualification
1	(United States) Kessy–Ross	3	3	0	6	6	1	6.000	150	106	1.415	Round of 32
2	(Czech Republic) Klapalová–Hajecková	3	1	2	4	4	4	1.000	133	138	0.964	Round of 32
3	(Switzerland) Graessli–Goricanec	3	1	2	4	3	5	0.600	125	139	0.899	3rd place ranking
4	(Austria) Hansel–Montagnolli	3	1	2	4	2	5	0.400	117	142	0.824	Eliminated

Date		Score		Set 1	Set 2	Set 3
14 Jun	Klapalová–Hajecková (Czech Republic)	1–2	(Switzerland) Graessli–Goricanec	18–21	21–14	9–15
14 Jun	Kessy–Ross (United States)	2–0	(Austria) Hansel–Montagnolli	29–27	21–11	
14 Jun	Hansel–Montagnolli (Austria)	2–1	(Switzerland) Graessli–Goricanec	13–21	21–19	15–10
14 Jun	Kessy–Ross (United States)	2–1	(Czech Republic) Klapalová–Hajecková	22–24	21–7	15–12
15 Jun	Klapalová–Hajecková (Czech Republic)	2–0	(Austria) Hansel–Montagnolli	21–16	21–14	
15 Jun	Kessy–Ross (United States)	2–0	(Switzerland) Graessli–Goricanec	21–13	21–12	

=== Pool D ===
Pos	Team	Pld	W	L	Pts	SW	SL	SR	SPW	SPL	SPR	Qualification
1	(Netherlands) Keizer–van Iersel	3	3	0	6	6	0	MAX	126	107	1.178	Round of 32
2	(Finland) Nyström–Nyström	3	2	1	5	4	2	2.000	119	101	1.178	Round of 32
3	(Norway) Maaseide–Tørlen	3	1	2	4	2	4	0.500	101	119	0.849	3rd place ranking
4	(Georgia (country)) Santanna–Martins	3	0	3	3	0	6	0.000	107	126	0.849	Eliminated

Date		Score		Set 1	Set 2	Set 3
13 Jun	Nyström–Nyström (Finland)	2–0	(Norway) Maaseide–Tørlen	21–12	21–13	
13 Jun	Keizer–van Iersel (Netherlands)	2–0	(Georgia (country)) Santanna–Martins	21–19	21–19	
14 Jun	Santanna–Martins (Georgia (country))	0–2	(Norway) Maaseide–Tørlen	19–21	16–21	
14 Jun	Keizer–van Iersel (Netherlands)	2–0	(Finland) Nyström–Nyström	21–16	21–19	
15 Jun	Nyström–Nyström (Finland)	2–0	(Georgia (country)) Santanna–Martins	21–16	21–18	
15 Jun	Keizer–van Iersel (Netherlands)	2–0	(Norway) Maaseide–Tørlen	21–15	21–19	

=== Pool E ===
Pos	Team	Pld	W	L	Pts	SW	SL	SR	SPW	SPL	SPR	Qualification
1	(United States) May-Treanor–Walsh	3	3	0	6	6	0	MAX	126	92	1.370	Round of 32
2	(Czech Republic) Kolocová–Sluková	3	2	1	5	4	2	2.000	115	98	1.173	Round of 32
3	(Czech Republic) Nováková–Tobiášová	3	1	2	4	2	4	0.500	106	117	0.906	3rd place ranking
4	(Italy) Giombini–Rosso	3	0	3	3	0	6	0.000	87	127	0.685	Eliminated

Date		Score		Set 1	Set 2	Set 3
14 Jun	Giombini–Rosso (Italy)	0–2	(Czech Republic) Nováková–Tobiášová	13–21	20–22	
14 Jun	May-Treanor–Walsh (United States)	2–0	(Czech Republic) Kolocová–Sluková	21–12	21–19	
14 Jun	Kolocová–Sluková (Czech Republic)	2–0	(Czech Republic) Nováková–Tobiášová	21–16	21–13	
14 Jun	May-Treanor–Walsh (United States)	2–0	(Italy) Giombini–Rosso	21–16	21–11	
15 Jun	Kolocová–Sluková (Czech Republic)	2–0	(Italy) Giombini–Rosso	21–10	21–17	
15 Jun	May-Treanor–Walsh (United States)	2–0	(Czech Republic) Nováková–Tobiášová	21–15	21–19	

=== Pool F ===
Pos	Team	Pld	W	L	Pts	SW	SL	SR	SPW	SPL	SPR	Qualification
1	(Greece) Arvaniti–Tsiartsiani	3	3	0	6	6	1	6.000	136	114	1.193	Round of 32
2	(Austria) Schwaiger–Schwaiger	3	2	1	5	4	2	2.000	119	103	1.155	Round of 32
3	(China) Huang–Yue	3	1	2	4	3	4	0.750	118	130	0.908	3rd place ranking
4	(Australia) Cook–West	3	0	3	3	0	6	0.000	100	126	0.794	Eliminated

Date		Score		Set 1	Set 2	Set 3
13 Jun	Arvaniti–Tsiartsiani (Greece)	2–0	(Australia) Cook–West	21–14	21–15	
13 Jun	Schwaiger–Schwaiger (Austria)	2–0	(China) Huang–Yue	21–16	21–10	
14 Jun	Huang–Yue (China)	2–0	(Australia) Cook–West	21–17	21–19	
14 Jun	Schwaiger–Schwaiger (Austria)	0–2	(Greece) Arvaniti–Tsiartsiani	19–21	16–21	
15 Jun	Arvaniti–Tsiartsiani (Greece)	2–1	(China) Huang–Yue	16–21	21–18	15–11
15 Jun	Schwaiger–Schwaiger (Austria)	2–0	(Australia) Cook–West	21–19	21–16	

=== Pool G ===
Pos	Team	Pld	W	L	Pts	SW	SL	SR	SPW	SPL	SPR	Qualification
1	(Australia) Bawden–Palmer	3	3	0	6	6	0	MAX	135	110	1.227	Round of 32
2	(Germany) Goller–Ludwig	3	2	1	5	4	4	1.000	150	146	1.027	Round of 32
3	(Germany) Banck–Günther	3	1	2	4	3	5	0.600	143	149	0.960	3rd place ranking
4	(Netherlands) Wesselink–Meppelink	3	0	3	3	2	6	0.333	130	153	0.850	Eliminated

Date		Score		Set 1	Set 2	Set 3
13 Jun	Bawden–Palmer (Australia)	2–0	(Netherlands) Wesselink–Meppelink	21–11	21–16	
13 Jun	Goller–Ludwig (Germany)	2–1	(Germany) Banck–Günther	21–12	17–21	15–9
14 Jun	Banck–Günther (Germany)	2–1	(Netherlands) Wesselink–Meppelink	21–17	19–21	16–14
14 Jun	Goller–Ludwig (Germany)	0–2	(Australia) Bawden–Palmer	14–21	27–29	
15 Jun	Bawden–Palmer (Australia)	2–0	(Germany) Banck–Günther	21–19	22–20	
15 Jun	Goller–Ludwig (Germany)	2–1	(Netherlands) Wesselink–Meppelink	19–21	21–15	15–12

=== Pool H ===
Pos	Team	Pld	W	L	Pts	SW	SL	SR	SPW	SPL	SPR	Qualification
1	(China) Xue–Zhang	3	3	0	6	6	3	2.000	162	127	1.276	Round of 32
2	(Switzerland) Kuhn–Zumkehr	3	2	1	5	5	3	1.667	145	136	1.066	Round of 32
3	(United Kingdom) Mullin–Dampney	3	1	2	4	3	4	0.750	111	133	0.835	3rd place ranking
4	(Mexico) Candelas–García	3	0	3	3	2	6	0.333	133	155	0.858	Eliminated

Date		Score		Set 1	Set 2	Set 3
13 Jun	Kuhn–Zumkehr (Switzerland)	2–0	(United Kingdom) Mullin–Dampney	21–11	21–16	
13 Jun	Xue–Zhang (China)	2–1	(Mexico) Candelas–García	21–12	17–21	15–9
14 Jun	Candelas–García (Mexico)	0–2	(United Kingdom) Mullin–Dampney	17–21	19–21	
14 Jun	Xue–Zhang (China)	2–1	(Switzerland) Kuhn–Zumkehr	21–13	18–21	15–9
15 Jun	Kuhn–Zumkehr (Switzerland)	2–1	(Mexico) Candelas–García	24–26	21–19	15–10
15 Jun	Xue–Zhang (China)	2–1	(United Kingdom) Mullin–Dampney	19–21	21–11	15–10

=== Pool J ===
Pos	Team	Pld	W	L	Pts	SW	SL	SR	SPW	SPL	SPR	Qualification
1	(Brazil) Taiana–Vivian	3	3	0	6	6	0	MAX	126	93	1.355	Round of 32
2	(Germany) Holtwick–Semmler	3	2	1	5	4	2	2.000	125	108	1.157	Round of 32
3	(Germany) Brink-Abeler–Grün	3	1	2	4	2	5	0.400	124	136	0.912	3rd place ranking
4	(Canada) Lessard–Martin	3	0	3	3	1	6	0.167	100	138	0.725	Eliminated

Date		Score		Set 1	Set 2	Set 3
14 Jun	Brink-Abeler–Grün (Germany)	0–2	(Germany) Holtwick–Semmler	26–28	11–21	
14 Jun	Taiana–Vivian (Brazil)	2–0	(Canada) Lessard–Martin	21–16	21–10	
14 Jun	Lessard–Martin (Canada)	0–2	(Germany) Holtwick–Semmler	15–21	14–21	
14 Jun	Taiana–Vivian (Brazil)	2–0	(Germany) Brink-Abeler–Grün	21–18	21–15	
15 Jun	Lessard–Martin (Canada)	1–2	(Germany) Brink-Abeler–Grün	21–18	12–21	12–15
15 Jun	Taiana–Vivian (Brazil)	2–0	(Germany) Holtwick–Semmler	21–17	21–17	

=== Pool K ===
Pos	Team	Pld	W	L	Pts	SW	SL	SR	SPW	SPL	SPR	Qualification
1	(Russia) Ukolova–Khomyakova	3	3	0	6	6	1	6.000	139	116	1.198	Round of 32
2	(Brazil) Maria Clara–Carolina	3	2	1	5	4	2	2.000	116	102	1.137	Round of 32
3	(Canada) Bansley–Maloney	3	1	2	4	2	4	0.500	105	121	0.868	3rd place ranking
4	(Australia) Barnett–Rohkamper	3	0	3	3	1	6	0.167	119	140	0.850	Eliminated

Date		Score		Set 1	Set 2	Set 3
13 Jun	Barnett–Rohkamper (Australia)	0–2	(Canada) Bansley–Maloney	17–21	20–22	
13 Jun	Maria Clara–Carolina (Brazil)	0–2	(Russia) Ukolova–Khomyakova	16–21	16–21	
14 Jun	Ukolova–Khomyakova (Russia)	2–0	(Canada) Bansley–Maloney	21–12	21–18	
14 Jun	Maria Clara–Carolina (Brazil)	2–0	(Australia) Barnett–Rohkamper	21–15	21–13	
15 Jun	Barnett–Rohkamper (Australia)	1–2	(Russia) Ukolova–Khomyakova	19–21	21–18	14–16
15 Jun	Maria Clara–Carolina (Brazil)	2–0	(Canada) Bansley–Maloney	21–13	21–19	

=== Pool L ===
Pos	Team	Pld	W	L	Pts	SW	SL	SR	SPW	SPL	SPR	Qualification
1	(United States) Akers–Branagh	3	3	0	6	6	1	6.000	142	116	1.224	Round of 32
2	(Belgium) Gielen–Mouha	3	2	1	5	5	3	1.667	144	137	1.051	Round of 32
3	(Italy) Gioria–Momoli	3	1	2	4	2	4	0.500	101	120	0.842	3rd place ranking
4	(Latvia) Minusa–Jursone	3	0	3	3	1	6	0.167	120	134	0.896	Eliminated

Date		Score		Set 1	Set 2	Set 3
13 Jun	Minusa–Jursone (Latvia)	1–2	(Belgium) Gielen–Mouha	18–21	21–14	13–15
13 Jun	Akers–Branagh (United States)	2–0	(Italy) Gioria–Momoli	21–15	21–17	
14 Jun	Gioria–Momoli (Italy)	0–2	(Belgium) Gielen–Mouha	17–21	10–21	
14 Jun	Akers–Branagh (United States)	2–0	(Latvia) Minusa–Jursone	21–16	21–16	
15 Jun	Gioria–Momoli (Italy)	2–0	(Latvia) Minusa–Jursone	21–19	21–17	
15 Jun	Akers–Branagh (United States)	2–1	(Belgium) Gielen–Mouha	22–24	21–15	15–13

=== Pool M ===
Pos	Team	Pld	W	L	Pts	SW	SL	SR	SPW	SPL	SPR	Qualification
1	(Italy) Cicolari–Menegatti	3	3	0	6	6	0	MAX	126	81	1.556	Round of 32
2	(United States) Fendrick–Hanson	3	2	1	5	4	3	1.333	130	109	1.193	Round of 32
3	(United Kingdom) Johns–Boulton	3	1	2	4	2	4	0.500	102	120	0.850	3rd place ranking
4	(Netherlands) van der Hoeven–van der Vlist	3	0	3	3	1	6	0.167	90	138	0.652	Eliminated

Date		Score		Set 1	Set 2	Set 3
14 Jun	Cicolari–Menegatti (Italy)	2–0	(Netherlands) van der Hoeven–van der Vlist	21–7	21–8	
14 Jun	Fendrick–Hanson (United States)	2–0	(United Kingdom) Johns–Boulton	21–16	21–12	
14 Jun	Johns–Boulton (United Kingdom)	2–0	(Netherlands) van der Hoeven–van der Vlist	21–18	21–18	
14 Jun	Fendrick–Hanson (United States)	0–2	(Italy) Cicolari–Menegatti	17–21	17–21	
15 Jun	Cicolari–Menegatti (Italy)	2–0	(United Kingdom) Johns–Boulton	21–17	21–15	
15 Jun	Fendrick–Hanson (United States)	2–1	(Netherlands) van der Hoeven–van der Vlist	21–10	18–21	15–8

=== 3rd place ranked teams ===
The eight best third-placed teams will advance to the round of 32.

Pos	Team	Pld	W	L	Pts	SW	SL	SR	SPW	SPL	SPR	Qualification
1	(Spain) Liliana–Baquerizo	3	1	2	4	3	4	0.750	111	116	0.957	Round of 32
2	(China) Huang–Yue	3	1	2	4	3	4	0.750	118	130	0.908	Round of 32
3	(United Kingdom) Mullin–Dampney	3	1	2	4	3	4	0.750	111	133	0.835	Round of 32
4	(Germany) Banck–Günther	3	1	2	4	3	5	0.600	143	149	0.960	Round of 32
5	(Switzerland) Graessli–Goricanec	3	1	2	4	3	5	0.600	125	139	0.899	Round of 32
6	(Czech Republic) Nováková–Tobiášová	3	1	2	4	2	4	0.500	106	117	0.906	Round of 32
7	(Netherlands) Kadijk–Mooren	3	1	2	4	2	4	0.500	110	122	0.902	Round of 32
8	(Canada) Bansley–Maloney	3	1	2	4	2	4	0.500	105	121	0.868	Round of 32
9	(United Kingdom) Johns–Boulton	3	1	2	4	2	4	0.500	102	120	0.850	Eliminated
10	(Norway) Maaseide–Tørlen	3	1	2	4	2	4	0.500	101	119	0.849	Eliminated
11	(Italy) Gioria–Momoli	3	1	2	4	2	4	0.500	101	120	0.842	Eliminated
12	(Germany) Brink-Abeler–Grün	3	1	2	4	2	5	0.400	124	136	0.912	Eliminated

=== Knockout round ===
==== Round of 32 ====
Date		Score		Set 1	Set 2	Set 3
16 Jun	Graessli–Goricanec (Switzerland)	0–2	(Brazil) Larissa–Juliana	16–21	15–21	
16 Jun	Kolocová–Sluková (Czech Republic)	0–2	(Brazil) Maria Clara–Carolina	17–21	14–21	
16 Jun	Taiana–Vivian (Brazil)	0–2	(United States) Fendrick–Hanson	23–25	20–22	
16 Jun	Arvaniti–Tsiartsiani (Greece)	0–2	(Spain) Liliana–Baquerizo	17–21	13–21	
16 Jun	Bawden–Palmer (Australia)	2–1	(China) Huang–Yue	24–26	22–20	15–11
16 Jun	Akers–Branagh (United States)	1–2	(Czech Republic) Klapalová–Hajecková	22–24	21–19	13–15
16 Jun	Nyström–Nyström (Finland)	0–2	(Germany) Köhler–Sude	19–21	19–21	
16 Jun	Keizer–van Iersel (Netherlands)	2–0	(Netherlands) Kadijk–Mooren	21–17	21–15	
16 Jun	Bansley–Maloney (Canada)	0–2	(United States) Kessy–Ross	14–21	14–21	
16 Jun	Holtwick–Semmler (Germany)	2–0	(Belgium) Gielen–Mouha	21–19	21–18	
16 Jun	Ukolova–Khomyakova (Russia)	0–2	(Germany) Goller–Ludwig	15–21	17–21	
16 Jun	May-Treanor–Walsh (United States)	2–0	(United Kingdom) Mullin–Dampney	21–13	21–12	
16 Jun	Xue–Zhang (China)	2–0	(Germany) Banck–Günther	21–12	21–12	
16 Jun	Cicolari–Menegatti (Italy)	2–0	(Russia) Vasina–Vozakova	21–16	21–18	
16 Jun	Schwaiger–Schwaiger (Austria)	2–0	(Switzerland) Kuhn–Zumkehr	21–14	21–14	
16 Jun	Talita–Antonelli (Brazil)	2–1	(Czech Republic) Nováková–Tobiášová	21–19	21–23	15–11

==== Round of 16 ====
Date		Score		Set 1	Set 2	Set 3
17 Jun	Maria Clara–Carolina (Brazil)	0–2	(Brazil) Larissa–Juliana	14–21	15–21	
17 Jun	Liliana–Baquerizo (Spain)	0–2	(United States) Fendrick–Hanson	19–21	13–21	
17 Jun	Klapalová–Hajecková (Czech Republic)	2–1	(Australia) Bawden–Palmer	16–21	21–19	15–13
17 Jun	Keizer–van Iersel (Netherlands)	1–2	(Germany) Köhler–Sude	17–21	21–17	11–15
17 Jun	Holtwick–Semmler (Germany)	1–2	(United States) Kessy–Ross	18–21	21–15	10–15
17 Jun	May-Treanor–Walsh (United States)	2–1	(Germany) Goller–Ludwig	21–19	18–21	15–11
17 Jun	Cicolari–Menegatti (Italy)	0–2	(China) Xue–Zhang	15–21	19–21	
17 Jun	Talita–Antonelli (Brazil)	2–1	(Austria) Schwaiger–Schwaiger	18–21	21–15	22–20

==== Quarterfinals ====
Date		Score		Set 1	Set 2	Set 3
17 Jun	Fendrick–Hanson (United States)	1–2	(Brazil) Larissa–Juliana	13–21	21–17	12–15
17 Jun	Köhler–Sude (Germany)	0–2	(Czech Republic) Klapalová–Hajecková	14–21	18–21	
17 Jun	May-Treanor–Walsh (United States)	2–1	(United States) Kessy–Ross	21–18	18–21	15–10
17 Jun	Talita–Antonelli (Brazil)	1–2	(China) Xue–Zhang	17–21	21–18	11–15

==== Semifinals ====
Date		Score		Set 1	Set 2	Set 3
18 Jun	Klapalová–Hajecková (Czech Republic)	0–2	(Brazil) Larissa–Juliana	14–21	13–21	
18 Jun	Xue–Zhang (China)	1–2	(United States) May-Treanor–Walsh	17–21	21–15	10–15

==== Bronze medal Match ====
Date		Score		Set 1	Set 2	Set 3
19 Jun	Xue–Zhang (China)	2–0	(Czech Republic) Klapalová–Hajecková	21–14	21–12	

==== Gold medal Match ====
Date		Score		Set 1	Set 2	Set 3
19 Jun	May-Treanor–Walsh (United States)	1–2	(Brazil) Larissa–Juliana	17–21	21–13	14–16
