= Visa FIVB Beach Volleyball International =

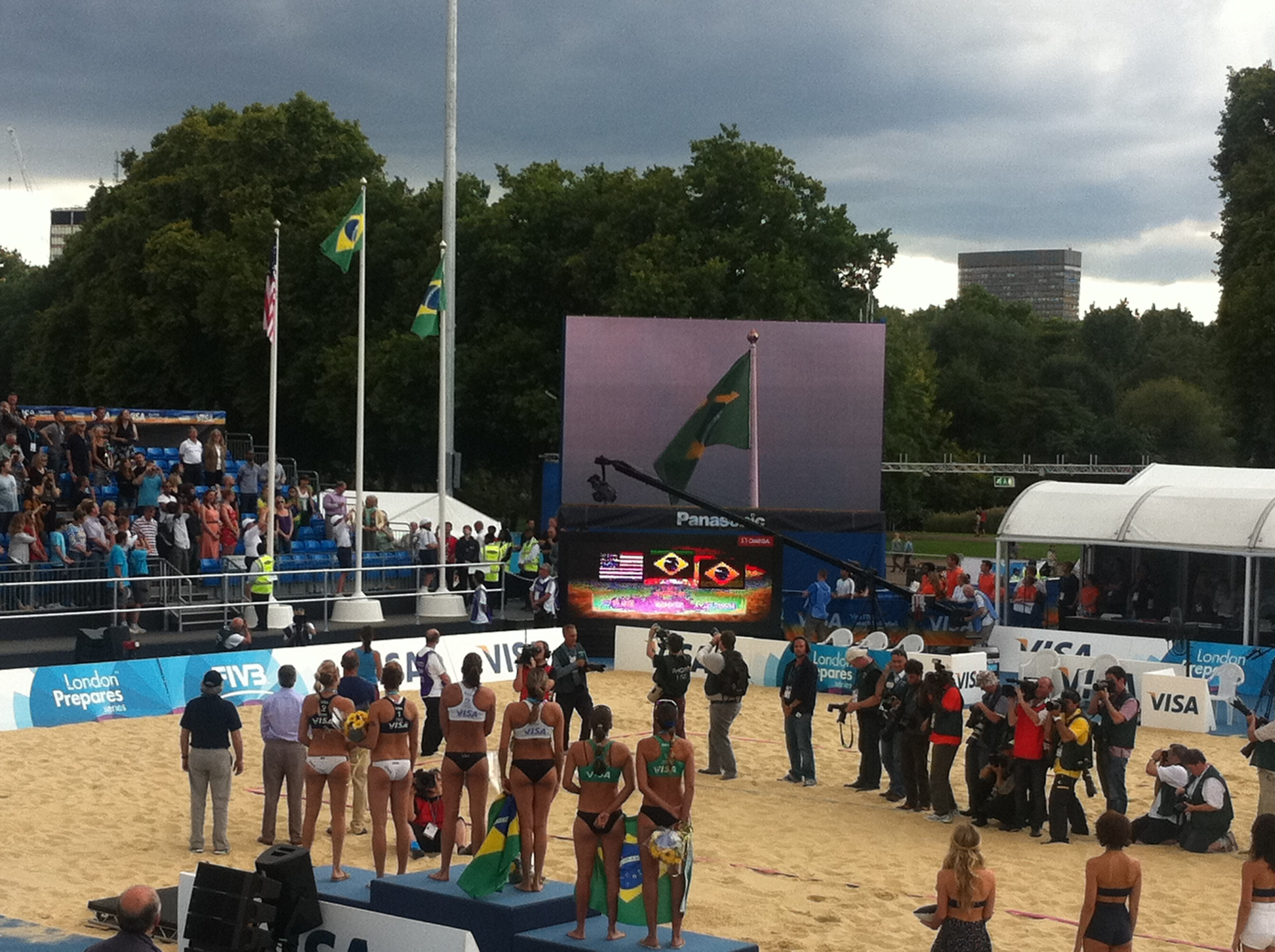
The podium at the Visa FIVB Beach Volleyball International

The Visa FIVB Beach Volleyball International was a women's beach volleyball tournament held at Horse Guards Parade, London, between 9 and 14 August 2011. It was the beach volleyball test event for the 2012 Summer Olympics and was part of the London Prepares series. The tournament, run as an exhibition, was won by the Brazilian pair Maestrini and Vieira. 2,274 tonnes of sand was transported to the parade ground for the event. After the tournament, the sand went to several locations within London to fulfill a legacy promise. The stadium had a capacity of 1,500 spectators. The play was affected by the 2011 England riots.

== Tournament ==
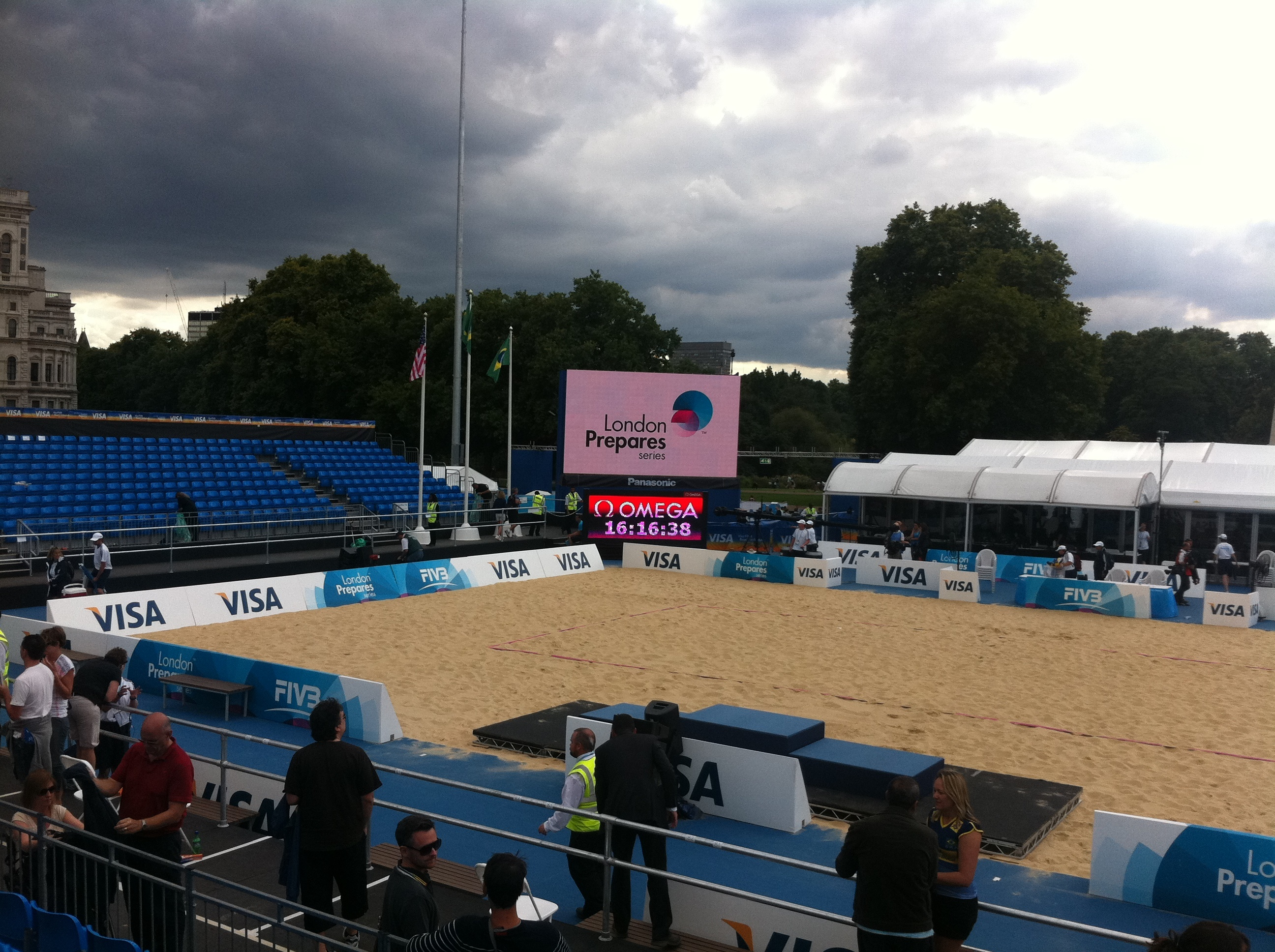
Centre Court, Horse Guards Parade.

The tournament featured 24 teams from around the world. It was jointly staged by the Fédération Internationale de Volleyball (FIVB) and the British Volleyball Federation. The event took place at Horse Guards Parade between 9 and 14 August 2011. The event saw 54 matches played but, although prize money was available, no ranking points were on offer, as it was classified as an intercontinental exhibition. Teams who were eligible to take part in the European Championships Final were not allowed to participate. A total of 2,274 tonnes of Redhill 28 sand was delivered from a quarry in Godstone, Surrey, to create one competition court and two practice courts. The main stadium had a capacity of 1,500, ten times fewer than the 15,000 capacity of the planned Olympic venue itself.

Participants included world number one team and 2009 world champions Jennifer Kessy and April Ross, Sydney Olympic champion Natalie Cook, and Beijing and 2011 World Championship bronze medalists Zhang Xi and Xue Chen. Six teams from Commonwealth countries were also invited as the London 2012 Organising Committee (LOCOG) and the FIVB wanted to demonstrate their support for beach volleyball becoming a sport at the Commonwealth Games.

=== Format ===
The format of the competition was similar to the one to be used at the Olympics. The 24 pairs were divided into 6 pools of 4 teams. The top two teams in each pool advanced to the last-16 knockout stage along with the best two third-place finishers in the groups. The remaining third-place teams then played off in "lucky loser" matches to determine the final two spots in the last 16. The knockout stages were seeded according to the teams' rankings in the pool stage.

=== Prize money ===
A total of 10,000 US dollars in prize money was awarded as follows.

Stage	Money in $
Champions	1,800
Runner-up	1,100
Third Place	800
Fourth Place	600
Quarter finalist	500
Last 16	300
Lucky losers	200
Pool Stage	150

=== London riots ===
Because of the riots affecting England at the start of the competition, all evening matches on 9 August were brought forward, and matches were played on practice courts, allowing people to get home safely. Natalie Cook said that the situation reminded her of the 1996 Summer Olympics, where she had to play in the bronze medal match after a bomb had been detonated.

== Preliminary phase ==
=== Pool A ===
On day one British pair Mullin and Dampney beat Clancy and Hynes of Australia in straight sets. On day two they played Santiago and Acevedo of Puerto Rico, going a set and 2–8 down and saving 3 match points before winning in 56 minutes. Meanwhile, Wang and Ma of China won both their first two matches. In the group decider, the British pair struggled at first but rallied and eventually won, although Mullin received a yellow card for disputing a line call. A win for Santiago and Acevedo put the Puerto Ricans in the last 16.

==== Standings and results ====
Rk	Team	Points	Won	Lost	SW	SL	Ratio	PW	PL	Ratio
1	Shauna Mullin – Zara Dampney (GBR)	6	3	0	6	2	3.000	154	135	1.141
2	Wang Fan – Ma Yuanyuan (CHN)	5	2	1	5	2	2.500	139	113	1.230
3	Yarleen Santiago – Dariam Acevedo (PUR)	4	1	2	3	4	0.750	126	128	0.984
4	Taliqua Clancy – Karley Hynes (AUS)	3	0	3	0	6	0.00	83	126	0.659

August 9, 2011; 17:25	Wang – Ma (CHN)	2–0	Santiago – Acevedo (PUR)	Centre Court; Referees: Glenn Sapp and Ehab Tadres
August 9, 2011; 17:25	(21–10, 21–17)			Centre Court; Referees: Glenn Sapp and Ehab Tadres

August 9, 2011; 18:20	Mullin – Dampney (GBR)	2–0	Clancy – Hynes (AUS)	Centre Court; Referees: Charalampos Papadogoulas and Elzir Oliveira
August 9, 2011; 18:20	(21–10, 21–13)			Centre Court; Referees: Charalampos Papadogoulas and Elzir Oliveira

August 10, 2011; 13:40	Wang – Ma (CHN)	2–0	Clancy – Hynes (AUS)	Centre Court; Referees: Drago Peslac and Rui Carvalho
August 10, 2011; 13:40	(21–16, 21–15)			Centre Court; Referees: Drago Peslac and Rui Carvalho

August 10, 2011; 21:05	Mullin – Dampney (GBR)	2–1	Santiago – Acevedo (PUR)	Centre Court; Referees: Drago Peslac and Rui Carvalho
August 10, 2011; 21:05	(17–21, 24–22, 16–14)			Centre Court; Referees: Drago Peslac and Rui Carvalho

August 11, 2011; 16:30	Mullin – Dampney (GBR)	2–1	Wang – Ma (CHN)	Centre Court; Referees: Glenn Sapp and Ehab Tadres
August 11, 2011; 16:30	(16–21, 21–18, 18–16)			Centre Court; Referees: Glenn Sapp and Ehab Tadres

August 11, 2011; 17:38	Santiago – Acevedo (PUR)	2–0	Clancy – Hynes (AUS)	Centre Court; Referees: Gregory Thompson and Elzir Oliveira
August 11, 2011; 17:38	(21–14, 21–15)			Centre Court; Referees: Gregory Thompson and Elzir Oliveira

=== Pool B ===
In the first round, Xue and Zhang of China beat Sinnema and Wiltens of the Netherlands 21–15, 21–8, while Elwin and Matauatu beat Roubains and Papageorgiou of Greece in straight sets. The same two pairs won in the second round. The group decider was played during a downpour. Elwin and Matauatu won the opening set, but the second seeds from China took the next two sets to win the match. Meanwhile, the young Dutch pair Sinnema and Wiltens exited the competition after a straight-sets loss to Roubains and Papageorgiou.

==== Standings and results ====
Rk	Team	Points	Won	Lost	SW	SL	Ratio	PW	PL	Ratio
1	Xue Chen – Zhang Xi (CHN)	6	3	0	6	1	6.000	138	100	1.380
2	Miller Elwin – Linline Matauatu (VAN)	5	2	1	5	2	2.500	138	123	1.122
3	Christina Roubanis – Joanna Papageorgiou (GRE)	4	1	2	2	4	0.500	103	116	0.888
4	Jolien Sinnema – Margo Wiltens (NED)	3	0	3	0	6	0.000	88	128	6.888

August 9, 2011; 13:40	Elwin – Matauatu (VAN)	2–0	Roubanis – Papageorgiou (GRE)	Centre Court; Referees: Glenn Sapp and Ehab Tadres
August 9, 2011; 13:40	(21–13, 23–21)			Centre Court; Referees: Glenn Sapp and Ehab Tadres

August 9, 2011; 14:35	Xue – Zhang (CHN)	2–0	Sinnema – Wiltens (NED)	Centre Court; Referees:
August 9, 2011; 14:35	(21–15, 21–8)			Centre Court; Referees:

August 10, 2011; 10:00	Xue – Zhang (CHN)	2–0	Roubanis – Papageorgiou (GRE)	Centre Court; Referees: Drago Peslac and Rui Carvalho
August 10, 2011; 10:00	(21–16, 21–11)			Centre Court; Referees: Drago Peslac and Rui Carvalho

August 10, 2011; 10:55	Elwin – Matauatu (VAN)	2–0	Sinnema – Wiltens (NED)	Centre Court; Referees: Drago Peslac and Rui Carvalho
August 10, 2011; 10:55	(21–14, 23–21)			Centre Court; Referees: Drago Peslac and Rui Carvalho

August 11, 2011; 13:40	Roubanis – Papageorgiou (GRE)	2–0	Sinnema – Wiltens (NED)	Centre Court; Referees: Glenn Sapp and Ehab Tadres
August 11, 2011; 13:40	(21–17, 21–13)			Centre Court; Referees: Glenn Sapp and Ehab Tadres

August 11, 2011; 14:35	Xue – Zhang (CHN)	2–1	Elwin – Matauatu (VAN)	Centre Court; Referees: Gregory Thompson and Elzir Oliveira
August 11, 2011; 14:35	(18–21, 21–19, 15–10)			Centre Court; Referees: Gregory Thompson and Elzir Oliveira

=== Pool C ===
Third seeds Kessy and Ross of the US all their matches. The crowd favourites, Uganda, finished bottom but expressed their determination to return for the 2012 Olympics.

==== Standings and results ====
Rk	Team	Points	Won	Lost	SW	SL	Ratio	PW	PL	Ratio
1	Jennifer Kessy – April Ross (USA)	6	3	0	6	0	MAX	126	68	1.853
2	Mari-Liis Graumann – Anu Ennok (EST)	5	2	1	4	2	2.000	110	95	1.158
3	Kacie MacTavish – Julie Rodrigue (CAN)	4	1	2	2	4	0.500	106	104	1.019
4	Josephine Nammanda – Alice Gitta Okecho (UGA)	3	0	3	0	6	0.000	51	126	0.405

August 9, 2011; 16:30	MacTavish – Rodrigue (CAN)	0–2	Graumann – Ennok (EST)	Centre One; Referees: Glenn Sapp and Ehab Tadres
August 9, 2011; 16:30	(17–21, 19–21)			Centre One; Referees: Glenn Sapp and Ehab Tadres

August 9, 2011; 18:20	Kessy – Ross (USA)	2–0	Nammanda – Gitta Okecho (UGA)	Centre One; Referees: Charalampos Papadogoulas and Elzir Oliveira
August 9, 2011; 18:20	(21–6, 21–8)			Centre One; Referees: Charalampos Papadogoulas and Elzir Oliveira

August 10, 2011; 18:20	MacTavish – Rodrigue (CAN)	2–0	Nammanda – Gitta Okecho (UGA)	Centre Court; Referees: Drago Peslac and Rui Carvalho
August 10, 2011; 18:20	(21–15, 21–5)			Centre Court; Referees: Drago Peslac and Rui Carvalho

August 10, 2011; 20:10	Kessy – Ross (USA)	2–0	Graumann – Ennok (EST)	Centre Court; Referees: Drago Peslac and Rui Carvalho
August 10, 2011; 20:10	(21–15, 21–11)			Centre Court; Referees: Drago Peslac and Rui Carvalho

August 11, 2011; 18:20	Graumann – Ennok (EST)	2–0	Nammanda – Gitta Okecho (UGA)	Centre Court; Referees: Glenn Sapp and Ehab Tadres
August 11, 2011; 18:20	(21–11, 21–6)			Centre Court; Referees: Glenn Sapp and Ehab Tadres

August 11, 2011; 19:15	Kessy – Ross (USA)	2–0	MacTavish – Rodrigue (CAN)	Centre Court; Referees: Gregory Thompson and Elzir Oliveira
August 11, 2011; 19:15	(21–11, 21–17)			Centre Court; Referees: Gregory Thompson and Elzir Oliveira

=== Pool D ===
British pair Boulton and Johns won the first match in the group with a straight sets win over Broder and Voth from Canada. Cunha and Lima of Brazil won their first two matches. The Brazilian pair won the group decider with a straight sets win over the British pair.

==== Standings and results ====
Rk	Team	Points	Won	Lost	SW	SL	Ratio	PW	PL	Ratio
1	Vivian Cunha – Taiana Lima (BRA)	6	3	0	6	0	MAX	128	87	1.448
2	Lucy Boulton – Denise Johns (GBR)	5	2	1	4	2	2.000	111	96	1.156
3	Tealle Hunkus – Heather Lowe (USA)	4	1	2	2	4	0.500	105	107	0.981
4	Jamie Lynn Broder – Ashley Voth (CAN)	3	0	3	0	6	0.000	74	126	0.587

August 9, 2011; 16:30	Boulton – Johns (GBR)	2–0	Broder – Voth (CAN)	Centre Court; Referees: Glenn Sapp and Ehab Tadres
August 9, 2011; 16:30	(21–10, 21–11)			Centre Court; Referees: Glenn Sapp and Ehab Tadres

August 9, 2011; 18:00	Cunha – Lima (BRA)	2–0	Hunkus – Lowe (USA)	Court One; Referees: Charalampos Papadogoulas and Elzir Oliveira
August 9, 2011; 18:00	(21–13, 21–17)			Court One; Referees: Charalampos Papadogoulas and Elzir Oliveira

August 10, 2011; 16:30	Boulton – Johns (GBR)	2–0	Hunkus – Lowe (USA)	Centre Court; Referees: Drago Peslac and Rui Carvalho
August 10, 2011; 16:30	(21–19, 21–14)			Centre Court; Referees: Drago Peslac and Rui Carvalho

August 10, 2011; 19:15	Cunha – Lima (BRA)	2–0	Broder – Voth (CAN)	Centre Court; Referees: Drago Peslac and Rui Carvalho
August 10, 2011; 19:15	(21–12, 21–18)			Centre Court; Referees: Drago Peslac and Rui Carvalho

August 11, 2011; 19:15	Broder – Voth (CAN)	0–2	Hunkus – Lowe (USA)	Court One; Referees: Glenn Sapp and Ehab Tadres
August 11, 2011; 19:15	(11–21, 12–21)			Court One; Referees: Glenn Sapp and Ehab Tadres

August 11, 2011; 20:10	Cunha – Lima (BRA)	2–0	Boulton – Johns (GBR)	Centre Court; Referees: Gregory Thompson and Elzir Oliveira
August 11, 2011; 20:10	(21–17, 21–10)			Centre Court; Referees: Gregory Thompson and Elzir Oliveira

=== Pool E ===
After two matches the Australian and Canadian teams were undefeated in group E. The Australians won the decider in straight sets win. Malaysia lost all three of their matches in straight sets.

==== Standings and results ====
Rk	Team	Points	Won	Lost	SW	SL	Ratio	PW	PL	Ratio
1	Natalie Cook – Tamsin Hinchley (AUS)	6	3	0	6	0	MAX	126	81	1.556
2	Heather Bansley – Elizabeth Maloney (CAN)	5	2	1	4	2	2.000	112	114	0.982
3	Alejandra Simon – Andrea García Gonzalo (ESP)	4	1	2	2	4	0.500	104	115	0.904
4	Beh Shun Thing – Luk Teck Hua (MAS)	3	0	3	0	6	0.000	94	126	0.746

August 9, 2011; 11:50	Bansley – Maloney (CAN)	2–0	Shun Thing – Teck Hua (MAS)	Centre Court; Referees: Glenn Sapp and Ehab Tadres
August 9, 2011; 11:50	(21–15, 21–19)			Centre Court; Referees: Glenn Sapp and Ehab Tadres

August 9, 2011; 12:45	Cook – Hinchley (AUS)	2–0	Simon – García Gonzalo (ESP)	Centre Court; Referees: Charalampos Papadogoulas and Elzir Oliveira
August 9, 2011; 12:45	(21–8, 21–16)			Centre Court; Referees: Charalampos Papadogoulas and Elzir Oliveira

August 10, 2011; 12:45	Bansley – Maloney (CAN)	2–0	Simon – García Gonzalo (ESP)	Centre Court; Referees: Drago Peslac and Rui Carvalho
August 10, 2011; 12:45	(21–19, 21–19)			Centre Court; Referees: Drago Peslac and Rui Carvalho

August 10, 2011; 17:25	Cook – Hinchley (AUS)	2–0	Shun Thing – Teck Hua (MAS)	Centre Court; Referees: Drago Peslac and Rui Carvalho
August 10, 2011; 17:25	(21–13, 21–16)			Centre Court; Referees: Drago Peslac and Rui Carvalho

August 11, 2011; 10:00	Simon – García Gonzalo (ESP)	2–0	Shun Thing – Teck Hua (MAS)	Centre Court; Referees: Glenn Sapp and Ehab Tadres
August 11, 2011; 10:00	(21–17, 21–14)			Centre Court; Referees: Glenn Sapp and Ehab Tadres

August 11, 2011; 10:55	Bansley – Maloney (CAN)	0–2	Cook – Hinchley (AUS)	Centre Court; Referees: Gregory Thompson and Elzir Oliveira
August 11, 2011; 10:55	(17–21, 11–21)			Centre Court; Referees: Gregory Thompson and Elzir Oliveira

=== Pool F ===
In the first match of the tournament, Mexican pair Candelas and Garcia defeated Brazilians Maestrini and Vieira. The Mexicans won their next two matches to win the group with three wins.

==== Standings and results ====
Rk	Team	Points	Won	Lost	SW	SL	Ratio	PW	PL	Ratio
1	Bibiana Candelas – Mayra García (MEX)	6	3	0	6	1	6.000	147	120	1.225
2	Liliane Maestrini – Angela Vieira (BRA)	5	2	1	5	3	1.667	158	141	1.121
3	Brittany Hochevar – Lisa Rutledge (USA)	4	1	2	3	4	0.750	124	129	0.961
4	Zhang Changning – Ding Jingjing (CHN)	3	0	3	0	6	0.000	87	126	0.690

August 9, 2011; 10:00	Candelas – García (MEX)	2–1	Maestrini – Vieira (BRA)	Centre Court; Referees: Glenn Sapp and Ehab Tadres
August 9, 2011; 10:00	(21–19, 26–28, 16–14)			Centre Court; Referees: Glenn Sapp and Ehab Tadres

August 9, 2011; 11:23	Hochevar – Rutledge (USA)	2–0	Zhang – Ding (CHN)	Centre Court; Referees: Charalampos Papadogoulas and Elzir Oliveira
August 9, 2011; 11:23	(21–18, 21–14)			Centre Court; Referees: Charalampos Papadogoulas and Elzir Oliveira

August 10, 2011; 11:50	Candelas – García (MEX)	2–0	Zhang – Ding (CHN)	Centre Court; Referees: Drago Peslac and Rui Carvalho
August 10, 2011; 11:50	(21–10, 21–17)			Centre Court; Referees: Drago Peslac and Rui Carvalho

August 10, 2011; 14:35	Hochevar – Rutledge (USA)	1–2	Maestrini – Vieira (BRA)	Centre Court; Referees: Drago Peslac and Rui Carvalho
August 10, 2011; 14:35	(18–21, 21–19, 11–15)			Centre Court; Referees: Drago Peslac and Rui Carvalho

August 11, 2011; 11:50	Candelas – García (MEX)	2–0	Hochevar – Rutledge (USA)	Centre Court; Referees: Glenn Sapp and Ehab Tadres
August 11, 2011; 11:50	(21–14, 21–18)			Centre Court; Referees: Glenn Sapp and Ehab Tadres

August 11, 2011; 12:45	Zhang – Ding (CHN)	0–2	Maestrini – Vieira (BRA)	Centre Court; Referees: Gregory Thompson and Elzir Oliveira
August 11, 2011; 12:45	(17–21, 11–21)			Centre Court; Referees: Gregory Thompson and Elzir Oliveira

== Knockout stage ==
=== Lucky loser ===
Santiago and Acevedo (Puerto Rico) and Rutledge and Hochevar (US) were the best third-placed teams, who automatically qualified for the last 16. Hunkus and Lowe (US), Simon and García Gonzalo (Spain), MacTavish and Rodrigue (Canada) and Roubanis and Papageorgiou (Greece) competed for the final two places in the last 16, which were won by the Spanish and Canadian teams.

==== Results ====
August 11, 2011; 21:05	Hunkus – Lowe (USA)	1–2	Simon – García Gonzalo (ESP)	Centre Court; Referees: Glenn Sapp and Ehab Tadres
August 11, 2011; 21:05	(20–22, 21–9, 9–15)			Centre Court; Referees: Glenn Sapp and Ehab Tadres

August 11, 2011; 21:05	MacTavish – Rodrigue (CAN)	2–1	Roubanis – Papageorgiou (GRE)	Court One; Referees: Charalampos Papadogoulas and Elzir Oliveira
August 11, 2011; 21:05	(21–16, 20–22, 15–11)			Court One; Referees: Charalampos Papadogoulas and Elzir Oliveira

=== Last sixteen ===
Maestrini and Vieira (Brazil), Cunha and Lima (Brazil), Kessy and Ross (USA), Xue and Zhang (China), Cook and Hinchley (Australia) and Boulton and Johns (UK) won in straight sets. Bibiana and Garcia (Mexico) and Mullin and Dampney (UK) won in three sets.

==== Results ====
August 12, 2011; 19:15	Mullin – Dampney (GBR)	2–1	Simon – García Gonzalo (ESP)	Centre Court; Referees: Glenn Sapp and Ehab Tadres
August 12, 2011; 19:15	(20–22, 21–16, 15–11)			Centre Court; Referees: Glenn Sapp and Ehab Tadres

August 12, 2011; 12:55	Graumann – Ennok (EST)	0–2	Maestrini – Vieira (BRA)	Centre Court; Referees: Charalampos Papadogoulas and Elzir Oliveira
August 12, 2011; 12:55	(10–21, 13–21)			Centre Court; Referees: Charalampos Papadogoulas and Elzir Oliveira

August 12, 2011; 17:25	Cook – Hinchley (AUS)	2–0	Elwin – Matauatu (VAN)	Centre Court; Referees: Drago Peslac and Rui Carvalho
August 12, 2011; 17:25	(21–14, 21–11)			Centre Court; Referees: Drago Peslac and Rui Carvalho

August 12, 2011; 13:50	Santiago – Acevedo (PUR)	0–2	Cunha – Lima (BRA)	Centre Court; Referees: Drago Peslac and Rui Carvalho
August 12, 2011; 13:50	(15–21, 12–21)			Centre Court; Referees: Drago Peslac and Rui Carvalho

August 12, 2011; 14:45	Kessy – Ross (USA)	2–0	Hochevar – Rutledge (USA)	Centre Court; Referees: Glenn Sapp and Ehab Tadres
August 12, 2011; 14:45	(21–18, 21–16)			Centre Court; Referees: Glenn Sapp and Ehab Tadres

August 12, 2011; 12:00	Wang – Ma (CHN)	1–2	Bibiana – García (MEX)	Centre Court; Referees: Gregory Thompson and Elzir Oliveira
August 12, 2011; 12:00	(18–21, 21–18, 13–15)			Centre Court; Referees: Gregory Thompson and Elzir Oliveira

August 12, 2011; 18:20	Boulton – Johns (GBR)	2–0	Bansley – Maloney (CAN)	Centre Court; Referees: Drago Peslac and Rui Carvalho
August 12, 2011; 18:20	(26–24, 22–20)			Centre Court; Referees: Drago Peslac and Rui Carvalho

August 12, 2011; 16:30	MacTavish – Rodrigue (CAN)	0–2	Xue – Zhang (CHN)	Centre Court; Referees: Drago Peslac and Rui Carvalho
August 12, 2011; 16:30	(13–21, 15–21)			Centre Court; Referees: Drago Peslac and Rui Carvalho

=== Quarterfinals ===
Cunha and Lima were the first pair to reach the semi-finals, defeating Cook and Hinchley in the final set after missing four match points. Boulton and Johns defeated Beijing medalists Xue and Zhang in straight sets, their first win in three meetings with them and the best win of their career to date. However, British number ones Mullins and Dampaney lost in straight sets to Brazilian pair Maestrini and Vieira. Ross and Kessy won a close first set against Bibiana and Garcia but won second easily.

==== Results ====
August 13, 2011; 18:00	Mullin – Dampney (GBR)	0–2	Maestrini – Vieira (BRA)	Centre Court; Referees: Glenn Sapp and Ehab Tadres
August 13, 2011; 18:00	(14–21, 20–22)			Centre Court; Referees: Glenn Sapp and Ehab Tadres

August 13, 2011; 13:00	Cook – Hinchley (AUS)	1–2	Cunha – Lima (BRA)	Centre Court; Referees: Charalampos Papadogoulas and Elzir Oliveira
August 13, 2011; 13:00	(17–21, 21–13, 15–17)			Centre Court; Referees: Charalampos Papadogoulas and Elzir Oliveira

August 13, 2011; 17:00	Kessy – Ross (USA)	2–0	Bibiana – García (MEX)	Centre Court; Referees: Drago Peslac and Rui Carvalho
August 13, 2011; 17:00	(21–18, 21–12)			Centre Court; Referees: Drago Peslac and Rui Carvalho

August 13, 2011; 14:00	Boulton – Johns (GBR)	2–0	Xue – Zhang (CHN)	Centre Court; Referees: Drago Peslac and Rui Carvalho
August 13, 2011; 14:00	(21–19, 21–18)			Centre Court; Referees: Drago Peslac and Rui Carvalho

=== Semifinals ===
The semifinals saw the fifth international meeting of the year between the two Brazilian pairs. Maestrini and Vieira came from three points down to take the opening set. In the second, they went three points ahead themselves. Cunha and Lima drew level, but Maestrini and Vieira won the last five points. In the other match, Americans Kessy and Ross took the first set 21–13, but Britain's Boulton and Johns took the second – the first time they had done so in four meetings between these two teams. The Americans, however, won the third set to win a place in the final.

==== Results ====
August 14, 2011; 10:00	Maestrini – Vieira (BRA)	2–0	Cunha – Lima (BRA)	Centre Court; Referees: Gregory Thompson and Darryl Friesen
August 14, 2011; 10:00	(22–20, 21–16)			Centre Court; Referees: Gregory Thompson and Darryl Friesen

August 14, 2011; 11:00	Kessy – Ross (USA)	2–1	Boulton – Johns (GBR)	Centre Court; Referees: Elzir Oliveira and Rui Carvalho
August 14, 2011; 11:00	(21–13, 17–21, 15–10)			Centre Court; Referees: Elzir Oliveira and Rui Carvalho

=== Third place playoff ===
Brazilians Cunha and Lima were too strong for Boulton and Johns, beating the British pair in two close sets.

==== Result ====
August 14, 2011; 14:00	Cunha – Lima (BRA)	2–0	Boulton – Johns (GBR)	Centre Court; Referees: Darryl Friesen and Glenn Sapp
August 14, 2011; 14:00	(21–19, 21–18)			Centre Court; Referees: Darryl Friesen and Glenn Sapp

=== Final ===
Kessy and Ross quickly took control of the first set, winning it 21–10. In the second set it was Maestrini and Vieira who started fast. The Americans rallied, but the Brazilians won the set. A closely fought final set reached a score of 13–13, but the Brazilians won the next two points to achieve their first win over the Americans in 2011. Maestrini was awarded the Visa Hero Award for her performance in the final.

==== Result ====
August 14, 2011; 15:00	Maestrini – Vieira (BRA)	2–1	Kessy – Ross (USA)	Centre Court; Referees: Damien Searle and Charalampos Papadogoulas
August 14, 2011; 15:00	(10–21, 21–15, 15–13)			Centre Court; Referees: Damien Searle and Charalampos Papadogoulas

=== Tournament bracket ===
Last 16
Mullin-Dampney GBR	2
Simon-Andrea ESP	1
Graumann-Anu EST	0
Lili-Vieira BRA	2
Cook-Hinchley AUS	2
Elwin-Matauatu VAN	0
Santiago-Acevedo PUR	0
Vivian-Lima BRA	2
Kessy-Ross USA	2
Hochevar-Rutledge USA	0
Wang Fan-Y.Y. Ma CHN	1
Candelas-Garcia MEX	2
Boulton-Johns GBR	2
Bansley-Maloney CAN	0
MacTavish-Rodrigue CAN	0
Xue-Zhang Xi CHN	2

Quarter-finals
Mullin-Dampney GBR	0
Lili-Vieira BRA	2
Cook-Hinchley AUS	1
Vivian-Lima BRA	2
Kessy-Ross USA	2
Candelas-Garcia MEX	0
Boulton-Johns GBR	2
Xue-Zhang Xi CHN	0

Semi-finals
Lili-Vieira BRA	2
Vivian-Lima BRA	0
Kessy-Ross USA	2
Boulton-Johns GBR	1

Final
Lili-Vieira BRA	2
Kessy-Ross USA	1
Third place
Vivian-Lima BRA	2
Boulton-Johns GBR	0

== Reaction ==
The event was praised by both spectators and the press, and British Olympic Association chief executive Andy Hunt suggested that a beach volleyball competition should be held in London every year, adding: "We've proved to the world that despite the incidents earlier in the week, ... all of the test events coped well and it's an opportunity to learn from that experience." London Evening Standard journalist Dan Jones commented: "I'm not sure that beach volleyball will ever be a direct solution for civil unrest and mob rule but it sure as hell diverts your mind from the aftermath." David Luckes, Head of Sport Competition at LOCOG, called the atmosphere "fantastic", and Vicente Araujo, Technical Delegate and FIVB Beach Volleyball Commission secretary, said the venue was "inspirational". Natalie Cook said that they "couldn’t ask for a better spot for our sport of beach volleyball to be showcased, so we’re very proud". The 2,274 tonnes of sand used for the event was distributed to Crystal Palace National Sports Centre, The Score Sports Centre in Waltham Forest and the sports centre of the Westminster Academy in London.
