= Marleen van Iersel =

Dutch beach volleyball player

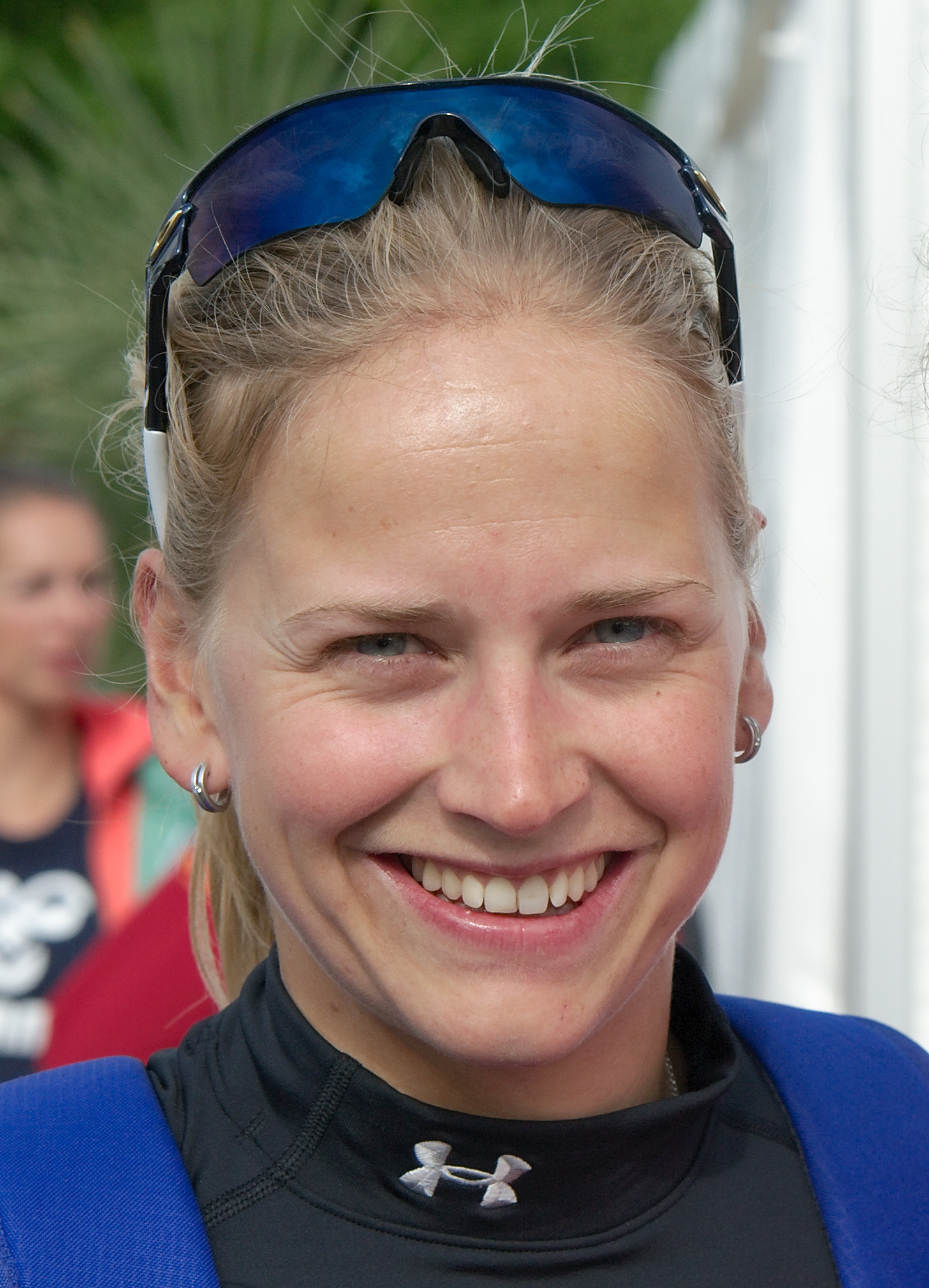
- van Iersel in 2015

Personal information
- Full name: Marleen Maria van Iersel
- Nickname: M (M&M)
- Born: 7 January 1988 (age 38); Breda, Netherlands
- Hometown: Goirle, Netherlands
- Height: 1.78 m (5 ft 10 in)
- Weight: 69 kg (152 lb)

Beach volleyball information
Years	Teammate	Tours (points)
2003; 2003; 2004; 2004; 2005; 2006–2008; 2005–2008; 2008–2013; 2014–2016	Jennifer Waninge; Roos van der Hoeven; Margo Wiltens; Arjanne Stevens; Angelique Vergeer; Daniëlle Remmers; Marloes Wesselink; Sanne Keizer; Madelein Meppelink	1 (0); 0 (0); 1 (0); 1 (0); 1 (0); 0 (0); 5 (26)

Best results
Years	Location	Result
2003; 2004; 2004; 2005; 2005; 2005; 2005; 2006; 2006; 2006; 2006; 2016	Pattaya WCha u18 Termoli WCha u18 Porto Santo WCha u21 Dutch nationals u20 Israel ECha u20 Saint-Quay-Portrieux WCha u19 Brazil WCha u21 Assen TTC; Austria ECha u23 Mysłowice WCha u21 Bermuda WCha u19 Summer Olympics	5th 4th 4th 1st 1st 5th 9th 1st 4th 3rd 2nd 9th
Honours
Women's beach volleyball
Representing Netherlands
European Championships
Gold medal – first place	2012 Scheveningen	Team
Gold medal – first place	2014 Cagliari	Team
U20 European Championships
Gold medal – first place	2005 Israel	Team
U21 World Championships
Gold medal – first place	2008 Brighton	Team
Bronze medal – third place	2006 Mysłowice	Team
Bronze medal – third place	2007 Modena	Team
U19 World Championships
Silver medal – second place	2006 Bermuda	Team

Marleen Ramond-van Iersel (born 7 January 1988) is a retired Dutch professional beach volleyball player.

== Career ==
Marleen van Iersel began her career playing indoor volleyball. She started playing at 7 years old and played for several indoor teams. At 15 years old, she played for VC Weert in the highest league in the Netherlands. In 2003, van Iersel made the switch to full-time beach volleyball and was selected by the Dutch National Beach Volleybalschool. With her playing partner Jennifer Waninge, she qualified for the Pattaya Under-18 World Championships in Thailand and finished in fifth place.

In 2004, Iersel again qualified for the Under-18 World Championships in Termoli partnering with Margo Wiltens. This time they reached the semi-finals and finished in fourth position. Later that year she qualified for the Under-21 World Championships in Porto Santo and finished fourth.

Van Iersel teamed up with Marloes Wesselink in 2005 playing in the Eredivisie of beach volleyball in the Netherlands (the highest league in the country). Their first World Tour event was in Gstaad where they finished 57th. The pair won the Dutch Under-20 national championships in Almere.

Iersel entered the Under-20s European Championships in Israel, eventually winning the event and taking her first international gold medal. A few weeks later at the Under-19s World Championships under 19 in Saint-Quay-Portrieux she finished in 5th position. Her final 2005 event was the Under-21s World Championships in Brazil where she finished 9th. Along with Wesselink she received the Beach Volleyball Talents award in 2005.

In 2006, Iersel travelled to Marseille to play in a FIVB World Tour event for the first time, and finished 41st. At the European Championship Tour event in Valencia she finished in 21st position. Later that year, she played in the Under-21s World Championships in Mysłowice and won the bronze medal. She stayed in Poland to play the Warsaw FIVB World Tour event, finishing 33rd.

At the Under-20s World Championships in Bermuda, Van Iersel played alongside Daniëlle Remmers. The tournament was shortened from 7–10 September 2006 to 7–9 September because of the Tropical Storm Florence which was likely to hit the island on 10 or 11 September. Their semi final match was won by two sets to love, which secured them a place in the final against Alice Rohkamper and Becchara Palmer from Australia losing 2–1.

== Professional career ==
=== Summer Olympics ===
At the 2012 Summer Olympics, she teamed with Sanne Keizer. They qualified from group D. Unfortunately, they were then drawn against Misty May-Treanor and Kerri Walsh Jennings, and lost 2–0 in the first knockout round.

She also participated in the 2016 Summer Olympics together with her teammate Madelein Meppelink, with whom she had teamed since 2014. They made it to the round of 16, and lost to the Swiss team of Heidrich and Zumkehr in 3 sets (21–19, 13–21, 10–15).

== Personal life ==
Iersel and her wife Myrthe Ramond got married in 2016. The couple have two sons.

Awards
Preceded by Maria Clara Salgado (BRA)	Women's FIVB World Tour "Best Server"; 2010	Succeeded by April Ross (USA)
Preceded by Larissa França (BRA)	Women's FIVB World Tour "Best Setter"; 2015	Succeeded by Larissa França (BRA)
Preceded by Nicole Branagh (USA)	Women's FIVB World Tour "Most Improved"; 2009	Succeeded by Taiana Lima (BRA)
