= Eileen Romanowski =

Australian volleyball player (born 1984)

Personal information
- Nationality: Australian
- Born: 3 January 1984 (age 42)
- Height: 1.83 m (6 ft 0 in)

Volleyball information
- Position: wing spiker
- Current club: Mount Lofty
- Number: 16 (national team)

National team
2002	Australia

Eileen Romanowski (born 3 January 1984) is a retired Australian female volleyball and beach volleyball player, who played as a wing spiker.

She was part of the Australia women's national volleyball team at the 2002 FIVB Volleyball Women's World Championship in Germany. On club level she played with Mount Lofty. In 2007, she played beach volleyball with Becchara Palmer.

== Clubs ==
- Mount Lofty (2002)
