= Agnes Nestor =

American labor leader, politician, and social reformer

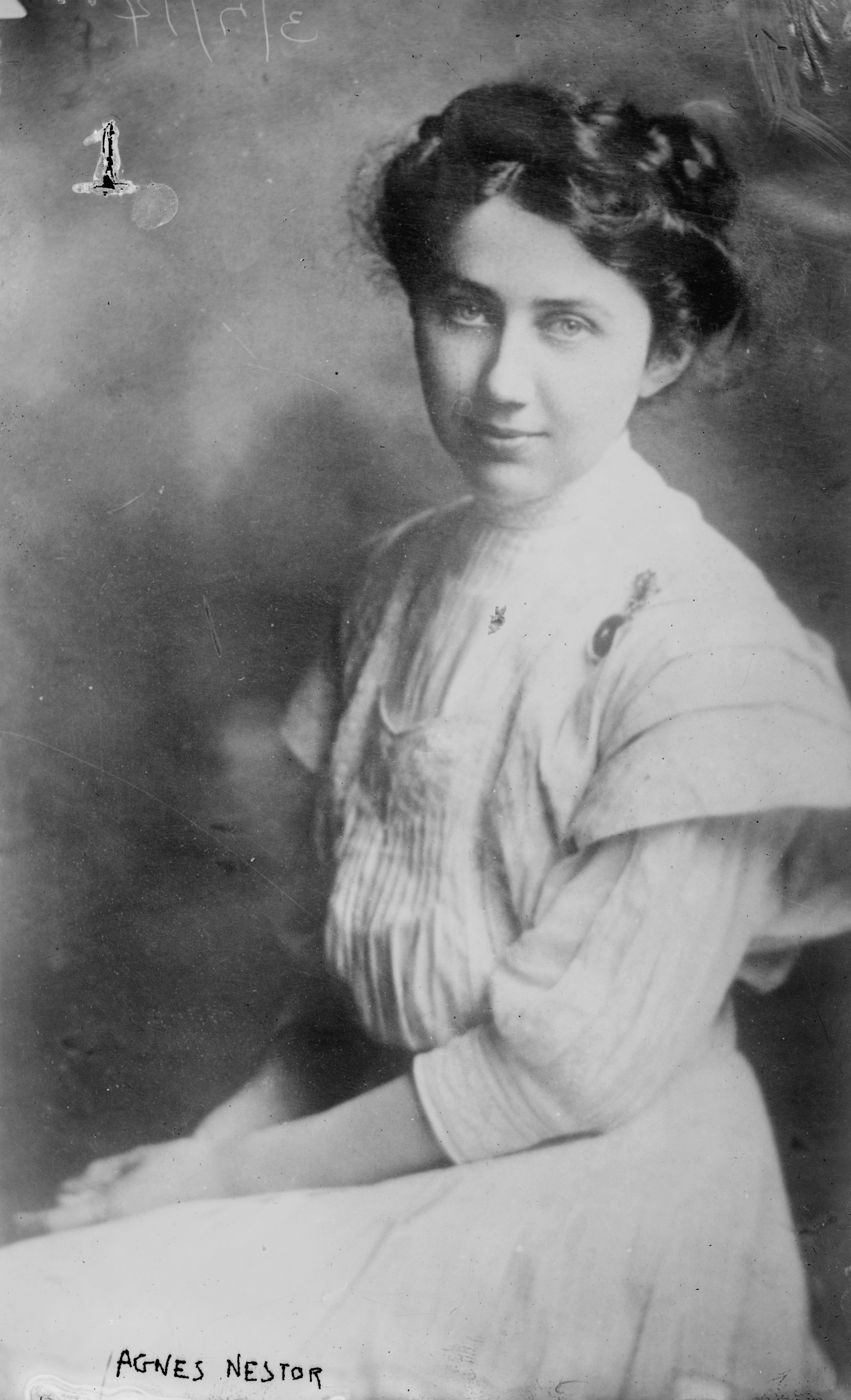
- Agnes Nestor in March 1914
- Born: 24 June 1880; Grand Rapids, Michigan, US
- Died: 28 December 1948 (aged 68); Chicago, Illinois, US
- Occupations: Labor leader, Politician, Social Reformer

Agnes Nestor (24 June 1880 – 28 December 1948) was an American labor leader, politician, and social reformer. She is best remembered for her membership and leadership roles in the International Glove Workers Union (IGWU) and the Women's Trade Union League (WTUL), where she organized for women's suffrage and workers' rights . Nestor's prominent activities included organizing women workers in Chicago in the early 1900s, running for public office, serving on national commissions to promote education, and securing work-hour limitations for women.

== Early life ==
Agnes Nestor was born on June 24, 1880, in Grand Rapids, Michigan to Thomas and Anna (McEwen) Nestor. Her father owned a grocery store there, but due to the depression of the 1890s he returned to his old trade as a machinist in Chicago, Illinois. In spring of 1897, Nestor and the rest of her family followed after their father and headed to Chicago.

== Career ==
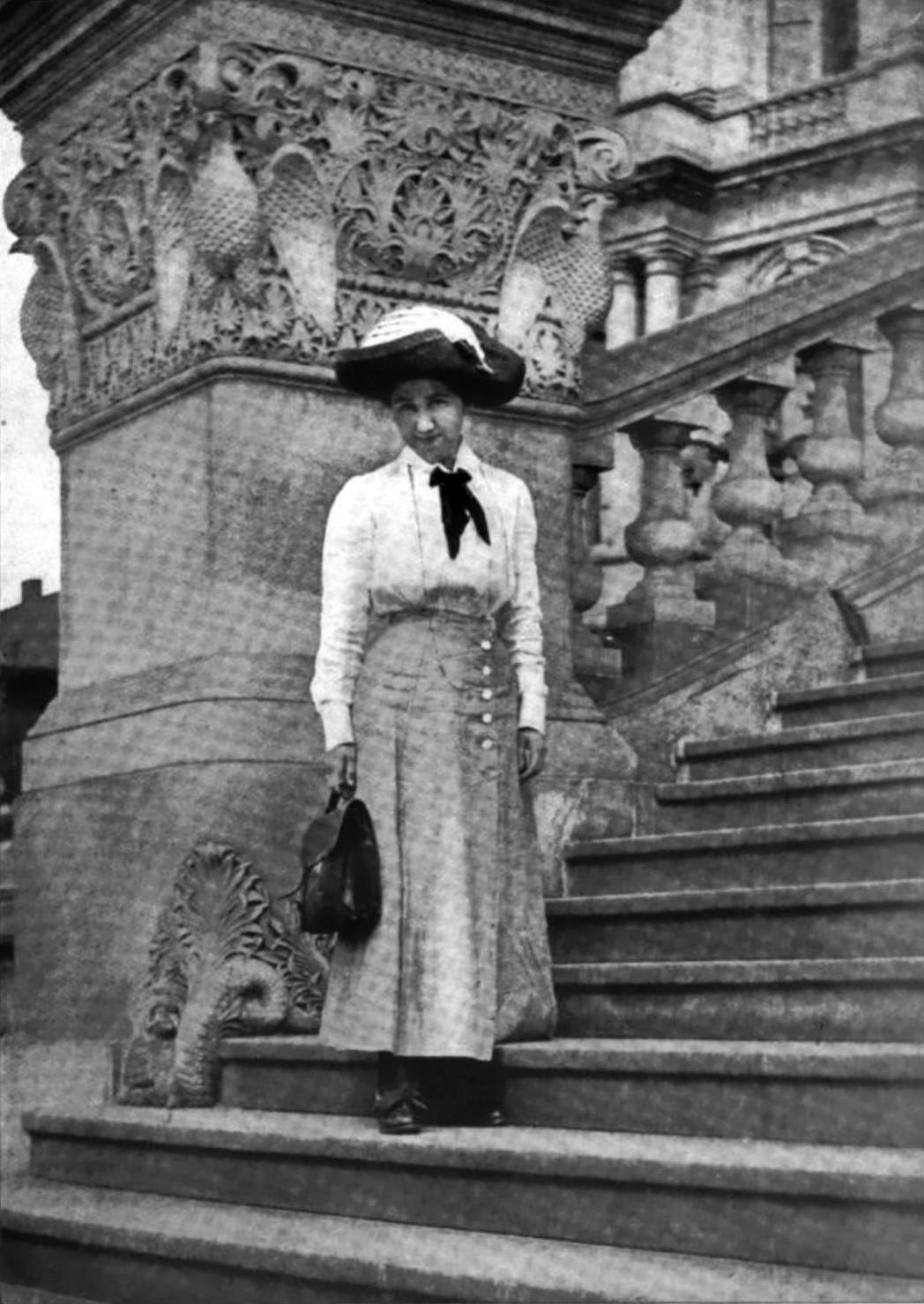
Agnes Nestor, 1912

Nestor, still in her teens, found work in Chicago's Eisendrath Glove Company (a non-union shop). In her autobiography Woman's Labor Leader, Nestor discusses the company's unjust practices such as: the company charged workers fifty cents a week for machine rental, workers had to provide their own needles (and if somebody was to break a needle they were charged for a new one to replace it), and also workers had to purchase their own machine oil, however, these unjust practices would not go unchallenged. In 1902 Nestor stepped forward as leader in a strike of women workers at the Eisendrath Glove Company (encouraged and supported by the unionised men), which lasted ten days. The strike was successful, all the women's demands were met; workers received a raise in pay, no longer had to pay rent for their machines, and the Eisendrath company took greater responsibility for their machinery, its greatest outcome being the implementation of a union shop.

=== International Glove Workers Union and the Women's Trade Union League ===
Following the success of the strike, Nestor took on more leadership roles. In 1902, the same small organization of women who took part in the Eisendrath Glove Company strike formed Glove Makers Local 2, with Nestor as a founder and leader. Nestor was the national vice president of the International Glove Workers Union from 1903 to 1906, secretary-treasurer from 1906 to 1913, general president from 1913 to 1915, vice-president, again, from 1915 to 1938, and director of research and education from 1938 until her death in 1948. As a leader in the International Glove Workers Union, Nestor gained prominence among labor leaders and earned access to network with notable women in Chicago society, many of whom she met through her involvement with women's clubs. Though there were differences between "club women" and "working women," particularly in terms of class, domestic roles, and educational attainment, the relationship and outreach efforts Nestor built with club women were to further the agenda of the International Glove Workers Union.

Nestor was also an active member of the Women's Trade Union League (WTUL) of Chicago beginning in 1904, and served as its president from 1913 to 1948. Unlike other women's clubs, the Women's Trade Union League admitted women regardless of class, the club's aim was to secure the organization of all women workers of the U.S. into trade unions in the hopes of gaining better working conditions, a reduced work day, a living wage, and full citizenship of women. At the Women's Trade Union League, Nestor worked alongside prominent women labor leaders Mary Kenney O'Sullivan, Jane Addams, Mary McDowell, Margaret Haley, Helen Marot, Florence Kelley, Elizabeth Maloney, Mary Anderson, Josephine Casey, and Sophonisba Breckinridge, together they were able to lobby, organize, fundraise, and create the WTUL into an influential and transformative organization.

The Women's Trade Union League seal exhibits the phrases "The Eight Hour Day," "A Living Wage," and "To Guard the Home," thereby conveying the message that the WTUL believed that in advocating for reduced work hours, and raising wages, women workers would be able to better attend domestic responsibilities at home. They would come to work diligently to achieve the status they longed for displayed on their seal. For many years attempts were made by various labor groups to enact legislation to protect women workers from overlong working hours, from the dangers of unprotected machinery, and sweatshop conditions. The WTUL took action in composing a bill that would make the previous goals attainable, the bill called for an eight-hour day. They worked for three years gathering reports on conditions under which women were working, including unorganized women who did factory work in their own homes (these women had no standard wages, and payments ranged, the poorer the woman the worse the tragedies). The reports were presented in the Women's Trade Union League's first exhibit, which was called "Exhibit of Dyanamic Sweatshops," they presented the eight-hour day bill as a health measure, because it was on those grounds that the Oregon ten-hour day was passed. The bill did not pass, Senator Jones suggested they exclude hotel and restaurant workers from the protection of the proposed law, and accept a ten-hour day, the WTUL refused to exclude any working women but did accept the ten-hour day, thus, in 1909 passed the Illinois ten-hour day (their proposed eight-hour day would be reached in 1937). In 1913, as president of WTUL, Nestor rode the "Suffrage Train" from Chicago to Springfield to speak and lobby on behalf of the Illinois Equal Suffrage Act and wrote "The Working Girl's Need for Suffrage" about how union women can improve work conditions by influencing legislation. The IESA passed giving Illinois women limited suffrage, but the ability to vote for President and local offices.

The topic of education for working women was just as crucial to the WTUL, they created an education program for working girls, in hopes of providing them with opportunities to explore cultural avenues which they had been denied from. In 1917, they worked out a plan with the Chicago Board of Education for the use of the classrooms of public schools (when they were not in use) to hold classes for the working women, Nestor particularly helped work out a course in the history of the trade-union movement. In 1918, Nestor joined a group organized by Samuel Gompers to travel on a Labor mission to Europe, the purpose of the mission was to cultivate international relationships between labor groups in the United States and in Europe and to demonstrate the readiness to help war-stricken Europe and cooperate once World War I ended.

When Nestor returned to Chicago, she formed the Cooperative Glove Association of Chicago in 1921 to compete against non-union shops, but it failed in 1925 because it could not compete effectively. She became involved in politics, running unsuccessfully in the Democratic primary for state legislature in 1928, serving on the Chicago Recreation Commission (1934), the Board of Trustees of Chicago's Century of Progress Exposition (1933-1934), and the Advisory Committee of the Chicago Planning Commission (1939). She opposed the National Woman's Party and the Equal Rights Amendment, arguing that the constitutional amendment would remove protections working women.

By the 1930s, the Great Depression would have affected both the WTUL and the IGWU financially, the latter suffered greater than the former. Even with such setback, Nestor continued her work as a labor leader and spent a lot of time fundraising for the unions. At one point, she served as the Director of Research and education for the IGWU-AFL. Nestor served on the National Recovery Administration in its work to regulate worker safety. In the last decade of her life, Nestor never retired, rather she spent her remaining years recruiting unorganized glove workers, and preventing the relaxation of labor laws during World War II.

== Death ==
Nestor died on December 28, 1948 (aged 68) in Chicago after years of suffering from infections and respiratory illnesses.

== Selected works ==
- (1910), The working girl's need of suffrage
- (1917), The trend of legislation affecting women's hours of labor
- (1921), Women workers marching on
- (1942), Brief history of the International Glove Workers Union of America, organized at Washington, D.C., December 17–20, 1902, charter granted December 23, 1902, by the American Federation of Labor
- (1954), Woman's labor leader. An autobiography
