= Marloes Wesselink =

Dutch volleyball player (born 1987)

Personal information
- Nickname: M (M&M)
- Born: 14 April 1987 (age 39); Doetinchem, Netherlands
- Hometown: Doetinchem, Netherlands
- Height: 1.75 m (5 ft 9 in)

Beach volleyball information

Current teammate
Years	Teammate	Tours (points)
2005-Present	Marleen van Iersel	5 (26)

Previous teammates
Years	Teammate	Tours (points)
2003-2004	Angelique Remmers	1 (0)

Best results
Years	Location	Result
2005; 2005; 2005; 2005; 2006; 2006; 2006	Dutch nationals u20 Israel ECha u20 Saint-Quay-Portrieux WCha u19 Brazil WCha u21 Assen TTC; Austria ECha u23 Mysłowice WCha u21	1st 1st 5th 9th 1st 4th 3rd
Honours
Women's beach volleyball
Representing Netherlands
European Championships
Gold medal – first place	2005 Israel under 20	Van Iersel
World Championships
Bronze medal – third place	2006 Mysłowice under 21	Van Iersel
- Last updated: 6 September 2006

Marloes Wesselink (born 14 April 1987) is a Dutch professional beach volleyball player born in Doetinchem.

She played indoor volleyball for a few years, playing at Orion Doetinchem, Sourcy Volleybalschool and Longa'59 Lichtenvoorde before she switched onto the beach. She had never played volleyball at the beach before but she was invited to it when she was a member of the Sourcy Volleybalschool. In 2003 and 2004 she played with several teammates, but mostly played with Angelique Remmers. They achieved some decent results and Wesselink felt a potential future in this sport. When teaming up with Marleen van Iersel in 2005 their skills improved fast, which resulted in a successful season.

They started off in the Eredivisie of Beach volleyball in the Netherlands, which is the highest league in the country. In Callantsoog they became second and in Assen they reached the 3rd position. Their first World Tour event was in Gstaad finishing 57th among the World's best teams. In the Eredivisie they kept on playing in the top 3 finishing 3rd in Nesselande and Amstelveen, while they finished 2nd in Gouda and Groningen. They took part at the Dutch national championships under 20 in Almere which they won. After that they also won the Eredivisie tournament in Scheveningen, while in Monster they became 3rd. Next step was the European Championships under 20 in Israel where they were among the favourites. They reached the final, which they won and took their first international gold medal. A few weeks later at the World Championships under 19 in Saint-Quay-Portrieux they reached the 5th position. Later in 2005 they took part in the Dutch national senior championships, finishing 5th. Their final 2005 event was the World Championships under 21 held in Brazil where they finished 9th. Van Iersel/Wesselink received the award for Beach volleyball talents 2005.

In 2006 both girls decided to concentrate on beach volleyball full-time, working on improving their skills more and more and also getting more experience. The first tournament of the season was an Eredivisie event in Kijkduin where they finished 2nd. On international level they started participating in higher quality tournaments like the European Championship Tour. In Hamburg they reached the 13th position. In the same weekend they travelled to Assen in their home country and in addition they won the TopTeams Cup Assen. In another 6 Eredivisie tournaments they reached one 1st place, four 2nd positions and a 3rd position, before heading to Marseille to play in a FIVB World Tour event. They reached the 41st position on the highest possible level. At the European Championship Tour event in Valencia they finished in 21st position. August 2006 turned out to be a good month for Van Iersel/Wesselink. First they travelled to South Korea to participate in an exhibition tournament where they finished 5th. A 4th position was reached a few days later in Austria during the European Championships under 23, while they had the ages of 18 and 19. The following weekend they took part in the Dutch national Championships in Scheveningen finishing 4th again, behind the three top Dutch teams for many years. With these results in mind they travelled to Poland to play the World Championships under 21 in Mysłowice. Again they faced opponents quite older than they were themselves, but this didn't seem to bother them much and they won the bronze medal. In the semi-finals they lost from the eventual champions, while they had beaten the same team in the group stage earlier in the tournament. In addition they stayed in Poland to play the Warsaw FIVB World Tour event, finishing 33rd.
