= Shauna Mullin =

British beach volleyball player (born 1984)

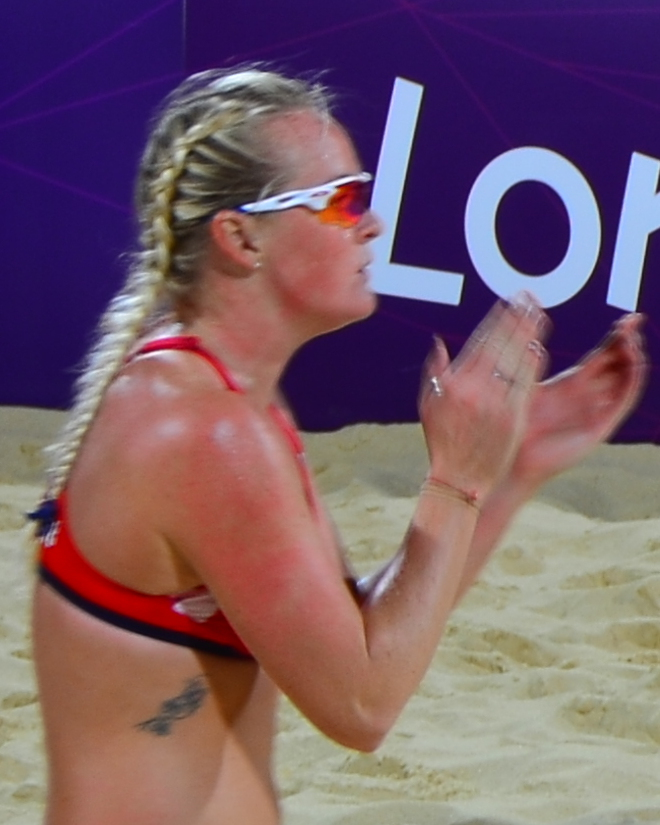
- Mullin during the 2012 Summer Olympics

Personal information
- Nationality: British
- Born: 11 September 1984 (age 42); Johannesburg, South Africa
- Height: 5 ft 10 in (1.78 m)
- Weight: 68 kg (150 lb)

Beach volleyball information

Current teammate
Years	Teammate	Tours (points)
2012	Zara Dampney	FIVB World Tour (125)

Previous teammates
Teammate
Denise Johns

Shauna Mullin (born 11 September 1984) is a British beach volleyball player, and former Scottish national indoor volleyball player. She was brought up in South Africa and Malaysia, but plays for Scotland and Great Britain. She was chosen as one of the two players to take the home nation qualification spot at the 2012 Summer Olympics.

== Early life ==
Mullin was born in South Africa, and first discovered volleyball while living in Malaysia. Her father was a hotel manager, so Mullin's family moved around a lot while she was a child and she spent time in boarding schools. In 1999, her family moved to Edinburgh, Scotland, she took a master's degree in Management with Business Law at Heriot Watt University. A second master's degree followed, in Marketing at the University of Bath.

== Career ==
She appeared for the Scottish national volleyball team between 2003 and 2006. While at university she appeared for the British team at the World University Beach Volleyball Championships, and joined the British beach volleyball programme in 2006. She began to compete on the Fédération Internationale de Volleyball in 2007.

Whilst on the tour, along with her partner Zara Dampney, she sold advertising space on the back of her bikini bottoms, hosting a QR code for bookmaker Betfair. They competed at the Olympic test event in London, and won all of their group games, but were defeated in the second knockout round by the Brazilian team who went on to win the tournament.

They finished in 17th place at the World Championships in 2011, which made them the highest placed British pair. They were knocked out by the reigning Olympic champions, Misty May-Treanor and Kerri Walsh.

Dampney and Mullin were awarded the host nation place for the beach volleyball at the 2012 Summer Olympics in London, where the events are due to take place on Horse Guards Parade. They will be the first British pair to compete in the sport at an Olympic Games since 1996. As of the announcement that they are to compete in the Olympics, Dampney and Mullins were ranked 37th in the world. Unfortunately, although the pairing reached the lucky losers match, they were knocked out by the Austrian pair of Schwaiger and Schwaiger.
