= Brooke Niles =

American beach volleyball player (born 1981)

Personal information
- Nationality: United States
- Born: March 11, 1981 (age 45)
- Hometown: Woodland Hills, California, U.S.
- Height: 5 ft 8 in (1.73 m)

Brooke Niles (also previously known as Brooke Hanson) (born March 11, 1981) is a professional beach volleyball player from the United States. She plays on the FIVB World Tour and Top US Pro Tour. Niles played volleyball at the University of California-Santa Barbara. She is Team Captain of 2012 ksm beach.

Niles and teammate Lauren Fendrick currently sat 3rd in US qualification (Feb. 2012) for the 2012 London Olympics and ranked 10th in the world after their first full season together playing on the FIVB World Tour and the top US Pro tours. In 2011 the team was one of the hottest, winning the U.S. Open, Miami Pro & AVP Championship & NORCECA Cayman Islands.

Niles was a four-year letter winner at UC Santa Barbara and a third-team All-American in 2002 while ranking third nationally in assists. As an outside hitter, she was named the Big West Freshman of the Year in 1999, and three times was selected to the all-conference team. Niles graduated from UCSB ranked fifth in career digs, sixth in assists, and eighth in aces.

In 2012, Niles became the first professional athlete to offer to brand a permanent tattoo with a corporate partner through a social media auction.

In May 2016, she was named the 2016 AVCA Beach National Coach of the Year for her work with the Florida State Seminoles beach volleyball team.
