= Tara West =

Australian volleyball player (born 1985)

Personal information
- Nationality: Australian
- Born: 29 November 1985 (age 40)
- Height: 183 cm (72 in)
- Weight: 78 kg (172 lb)
- Spike: 307 cm (121 in)
- Block: 292 cm (115 in)

Volleyball information
- Number: 5 (national team)

Career
| Years | Teams |
|---|---|
| 2014 | WA Pearls |

National team
| 2014 | Australia |

Tara West (born 29 November 1985) is an Australian female volleyball player. She is part of the Australia women's national volleyball team.

She participated in the 2014 FIVB Volleyball World Grand Prix. On club level she played for WA Pearls in 2014.
