= Tereza Tobiášová =

Czech beach volleyball player (born 1974)

Personal information
- Nationality: Czech
- Born: 10 April 1974 (age 52) Brno, Czechoslovakia

Sport
- Sport: Beach volleyball

Tereza Tobiášová (born 10 April 1974) is a Czech beach volleyball player. She competed in the women's tournament at the 2000 Summer Olympics.
