= Elizabeth Maloney =

American labor organizer (1880–1921)

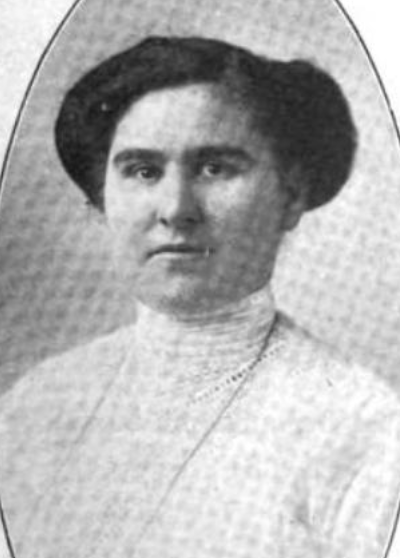
- Maloney, from a 1913 publication
- Born: November 19, 1880; Joliet, Illinois, U.S.
- Died: October 26, 1921 (aged 40); Chicago, Illinois, U.S.
- Occupations: Waitress, labor organizer, lobbyist

Elizabeth Maloney (November 19, 1880 – October 26, 1921) was an American labor organizer and lobbyist, based in Chicago. She represented the Waitresses' Union on the executive boards of the Chicago Federation of Labor and the Women's Trade Union League, and worked with Agnes Nestor on women's labor laws in Illinois.

== Early life ==
Maloney was born in Joliet, Illinois, the daughter of William Maloney and Margaret "Maggie" Maloney. Her father and her maternal grandparents were born in Ireland; her mother died in 1884.

== Career ==
Maloney was a waitress. "She takes a wholesome pride in her own competence," reported Miles Franklin in a 1913 profile. She was a founding member and officer of the Waitresses' Union Local 484, and represented the Waitresses' Union on the executive boards of the Women's Trade Union League and the Chicago Federation of Labor. She was vice-president of the Hotel and Restaurant Employees' International Alliance.

Maloney and Agnes Nestor led the lobbying effort for a six-day work week and a ten-hour work day for all women in Illinois, regardless of occupation. They succeeded in 1911, when those limits became state law. After their success, Maloney and Nestor sought Illinois laws providing a minimum wage and an eight-hour work day for women. Maloney was appointed by the governor to a state industrial survey commission to study women's working conditions.

== Death and legacy ==
Maloney died in 1921, in Chicago, at age 40. A tribute at the time recalled her "energy and tirelessness that was alike astonishing and satisfying to all concerned in promoting the good work". The pallbearers at her funeral included Chicago labor leaders Edward Flore, John Fitzpatrick, and Thomas Kennedy, and Jane Addams, Mary Rozet Smith, Ellen Gates Starr, Alice Henry, Margaret Haley, Edith Franklin Wyatt, and Agnes Nestor were members of the all-women "Guard of Honor", recognizing Maloney as a sister-in-arms.

Maloney was inducted into the Illinois Labor History Society's Hall of Honor in 2015.
