= Zara Dampney =

British beach volleyball player (born 1986)

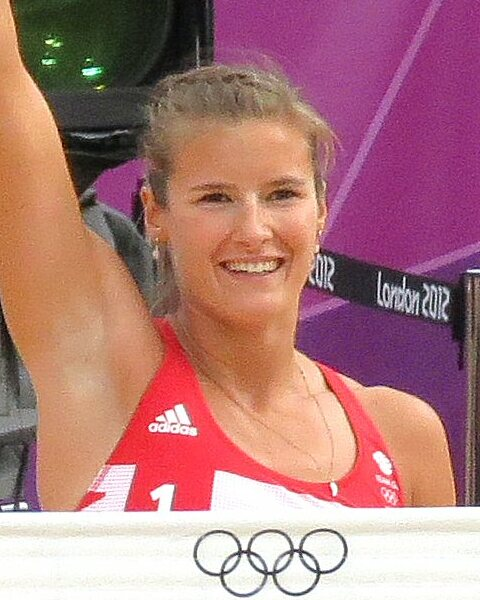
- Dampney during the 2012 Summer Olympics

Personal information
- Nationality: British
- Born: 10 June 1986 (age 40) Christchurch, Dorset, England
- Home town: Bath, Somerset
- Height: 5 ft 10 in (1.78 m)
- Weight: 65 kg (143 lb)
Beach volleyball information
Current teammate
Years	Teammate	Tours (points)
2012	Shauna Mullin	FIVB World Tour (125)
Previous teammates
Years	Teammate	
–	Liane Herbert; Lucy Boulton	

Zara Dampney (born 10 June 1986) is a British beach volleyball player, and former indoor volleyball player. She was chosen as one of the two players to take the home nation qualification spot at the 2012 Summer Olympics, with teammate Shauna Mullin.

== Early life ==
Dampney was born in Christchurch on 10 June 1986, and lived throughout her childhood in Dorset. She played indoor volleyball whilst a student at Parkstone Grammar School, and after school went to the University of Sheffield where she studied for a law degree. She competed for the British adult team in indoor volleyball at the age of sixteen, and was a member of Wessex Volleyball Club.

== Career ==
After completing her university degree, she made her début on the Fédération Internationale de Volleyball tour in 2009, and was part of the first British team to compete on the tour for a decade. The team finished in ninth position in that event, which remains Dampney's highest finish on the tour.

Whilst on the tour, along with her partner Shauna Mullin, she sold advertising space on the back of her bikini bottoms, hosting a QR code for bookmaker Betfair. They competed at the Olympic test event in London, and won all of their group games, but were defeated in the second knockout round by the Brazilian team who went on to win the tournament.

Dampney and Mullin were awarded the host nation place for the beach volleyball at the 2012 Summer Olympics in London, where the events took place on Horse Guards Parade. They were the first British pair to compete in the sport at an Olympic Games. As of the announcement that they were to compete in the Olympics, Dampney and Mullin were ranked 37th in the world.

At the 2012 Summer Olympics, they did not qualify from group F, but played well enough to play in the lucky loser match, where they lost to the Schwaiger sisters of Austria.

== Personal life ==
She is married to former New Zealand beach volleyball player Kirk Pitman, with whom she has two children, daughter Florence and son Otto.
