= Becchara Palmer =

Australian beach volleyball player

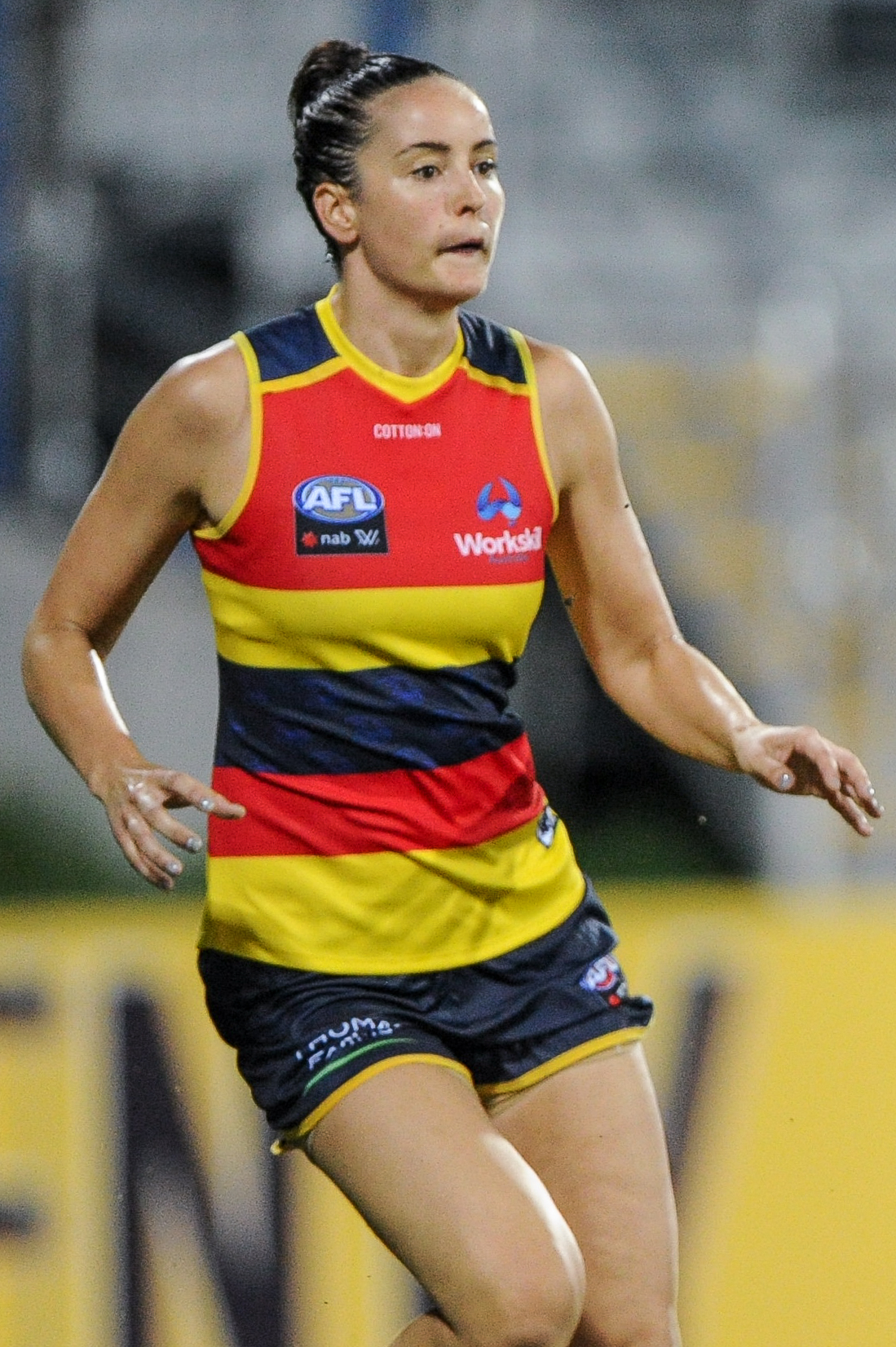
- Palmer playing Australian rules football for Adelaide in January 2018
- Born: 18 June 1988 (age 38); Adelaide, Australia
- Volleyball career
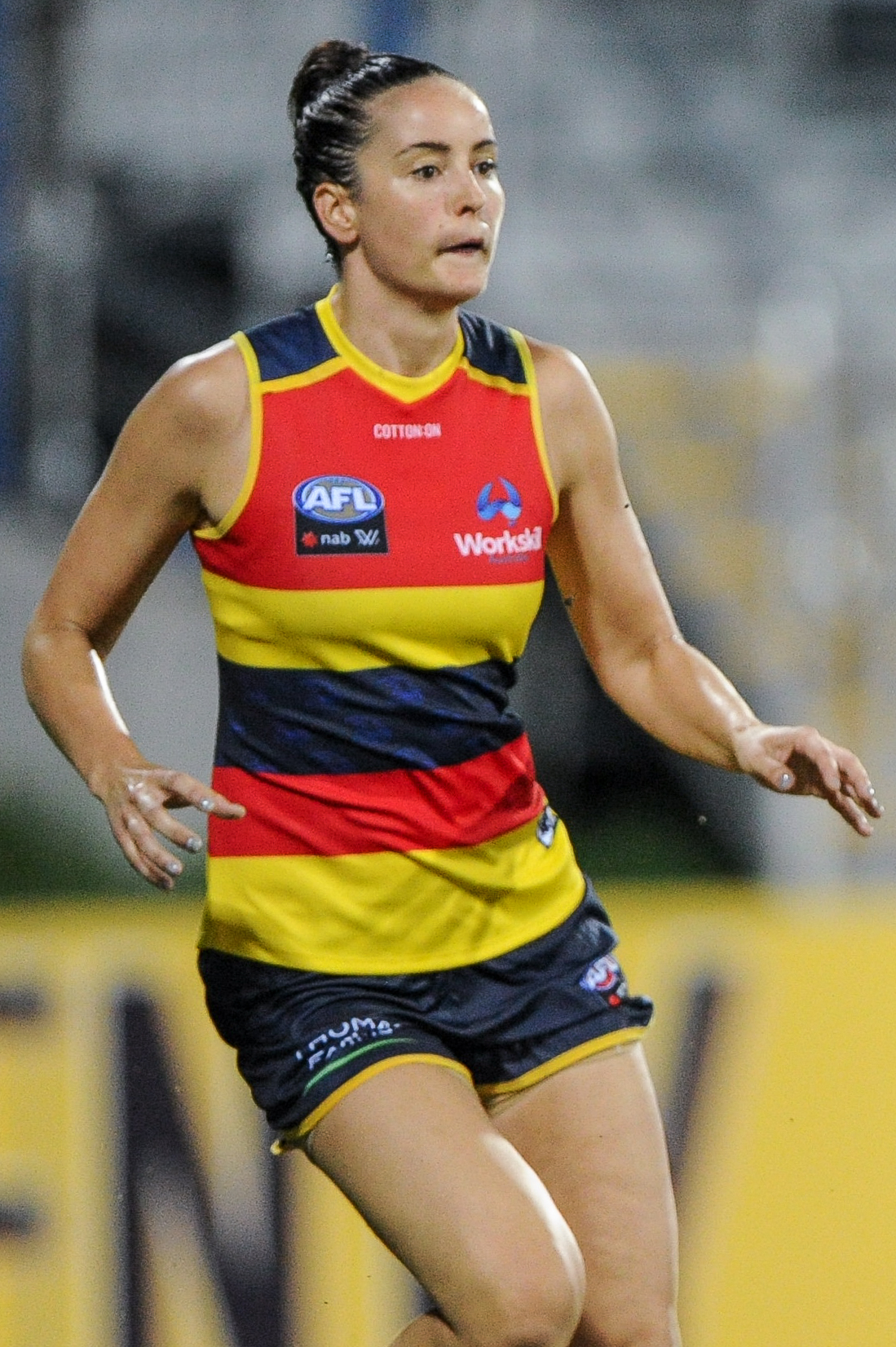

Personal information
- Height: 182 cm (6 ft 0 in) (2012)
- Weight: 67 kg (148 lb) (2012)
Australian rules football career
Playing career
Years	Club	Games (Goals)
2018	Adelaide	0 (0)

Becchara Palmer (born 18 June 1988) is an Australian female beach volleyball player. She represented Australia at the 2012 Summer Olympics in the beach volleyball women's tournament.

== Personal ==
Palmer was born in Adelaide, and is from South Australia. As of 2019, she lives in Sydney.

Palmer is 182 centimetres (6 ft 0 in) tall and weighs 67 kilograms (148 lb).

== Beach volleyball ==
Palmer is a beach volleyball player. She started competing in beach volleyball in 2005, and retired in 2021. In 2006, she won the Junior World Champion in Bermunda with her first partner, Alice Rohkamper.

In 2007, Palmer switched from juniors to seniors, alternatively playing with Rohkamper and Eileen Romanowski. She became partners with Louise Bawden in 2009. At the 2009 Mazury Open in Poland, she and partner Bawden finished second. The competition was part of the FIVB World Tour. She and Bawden twice won the Australian Championships, once in 2010 and again in 2011. In 2011, Palmer and Bawden were Australia's number one ranked team. At the 2011 World Championships, the duo finished ninth. With her partner Bawden, she finished seventeenth at the 2011 FIVB Moscow World Tour in Moscow, Russia. With her partner, she finished fourth at the 2011 FIVB Phuket World Tour in Phuket, Thailand. She missed parts of the 2011 World Tour series because of an abdominal strain.

In 2012, Bawden and Palmer played in 31 matches, winning 20 of them. This increased their world ranking to 16. With her partner, she finished ninth at the 2012 FIVB Brasília World Tour in Brasília, Brazil. With her partner, she finished fifth at the 2012 FIVB Sanya World Tour in Sanya, China. With her partner, she finished seventeenth at the 2012 FIVB Shanghai World Tour in Shanghai, China. With her partner, she finished ninth at the 2012 FIVB Beijing World Tour in Beijing, China. With her partner, she finished ninth at the 2012 FIVB Rome World Tour in Rome, Italy, which secured her Olympic berth. With her partner, she finished fifth at the 2012 FIVB Moscow World Tour in Moscow, Russia.

Palmer and Bawden were selected to represent Australia at the 2012 Summer Olympics in beach volleyball in June 2012 following a selection process that was 18 months long and involved becoming one of the sixteen top ranked teams in the world. Going into the Olympics, her team was ranked fourteenth in the world. She competed at the Games as a twenty-four-year-old, where she was the youngest of Australia's female beach volleyball players.

== AFL Women's ==
On 2 June 2017, Adelaide signed Palmer to their rookie list for the 2018 AFL Women's season. She was delisted by Adelaide at the end of the 2018 season.
