= Saint-Quay-Portrieux =

Saint-Quay-Portrieux Sant-Ke-Porzh-Olued (Breton)
- Commune
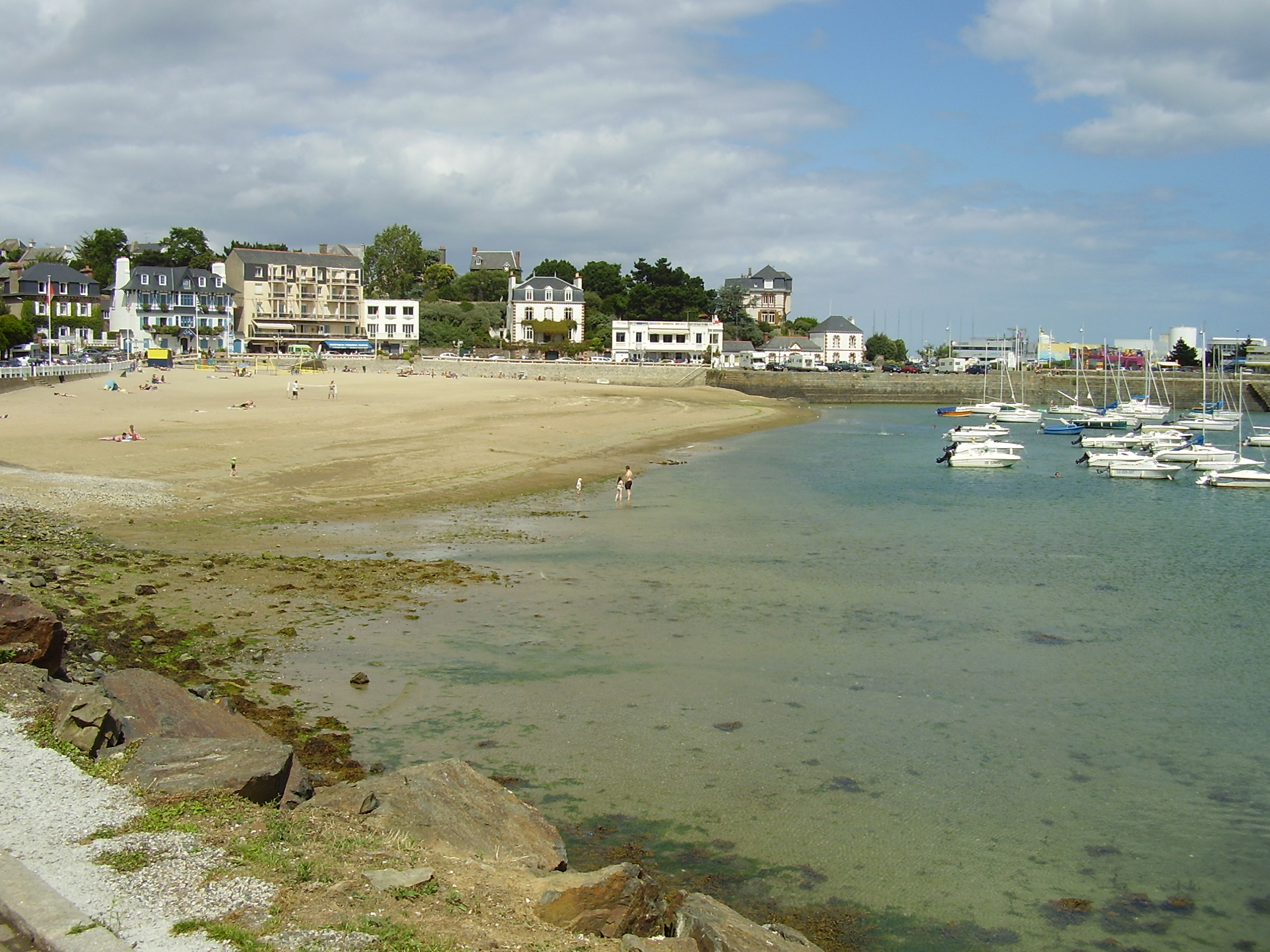
- The beach and harbour of Saint-Quay-Portrieux

- Flag Coat of arms
- Location of Saint-Quay-Portrieux
- Location within France Location within Brittany
- Coordinates: 48°38′51″N 2°49′40″W
- Country: France
- Region: Brittany
- Department: Côtes-d'Armor
- Arrondissement: Saint-Brieuc
- Canton: Plouha
- Intercommunality: Saint-Brieuc Armor

Government
  - Mayor (2020–2026): Thierry Simelière
- Area^{1}: 3.87 km^{2} (1.49 sq mi)
- Highest elevation: 74 m (243 ft)
- Lowest elevation: 0 m (0 ft)
- Population (2023): 3,224
  - Density: 833/km^{2} (2,160/sq mi)
- Time zone: UTC+01:00 (CET)
  - Summer (DST): UTC+02:00 (CEST)
- INSEE/Postal code: 22325 /22410
- ^{1} French Land Register data, which excludes lakes, ponds, glaciers > 1 km^{2} (0.386 sq mi or 247 acres) and river estuaries.

Saint-Quay-Portrieux (French pronunciation: [sɛ̃ kɛ pɔʁtʁijø]; Breton: Sant-Ke-Porzh-Olued) is a commune in the Côtes-d'Armor department of Brittany in northwestern France.

== Population ==
Inhabitants of Saint-Quay-Portrieux are called quinocéens in French.

Historical population
Year	Pop.	±% p.a.
1968	3,105	—
1975	3,123	+0.08%
1982	2,977	−0.68%
1990	3,018	+0.17%
1999	3,114	+0.35%
2007	3,054	−0.24%
2012	3,052	−0.01%
2017	2,997	−0.36%
2023	3,224	+1.22%
Source: INSEE

== See also ==
- Communes of the Côtes-d'Armor department
