= Denise Johns =

British beach volleyball player

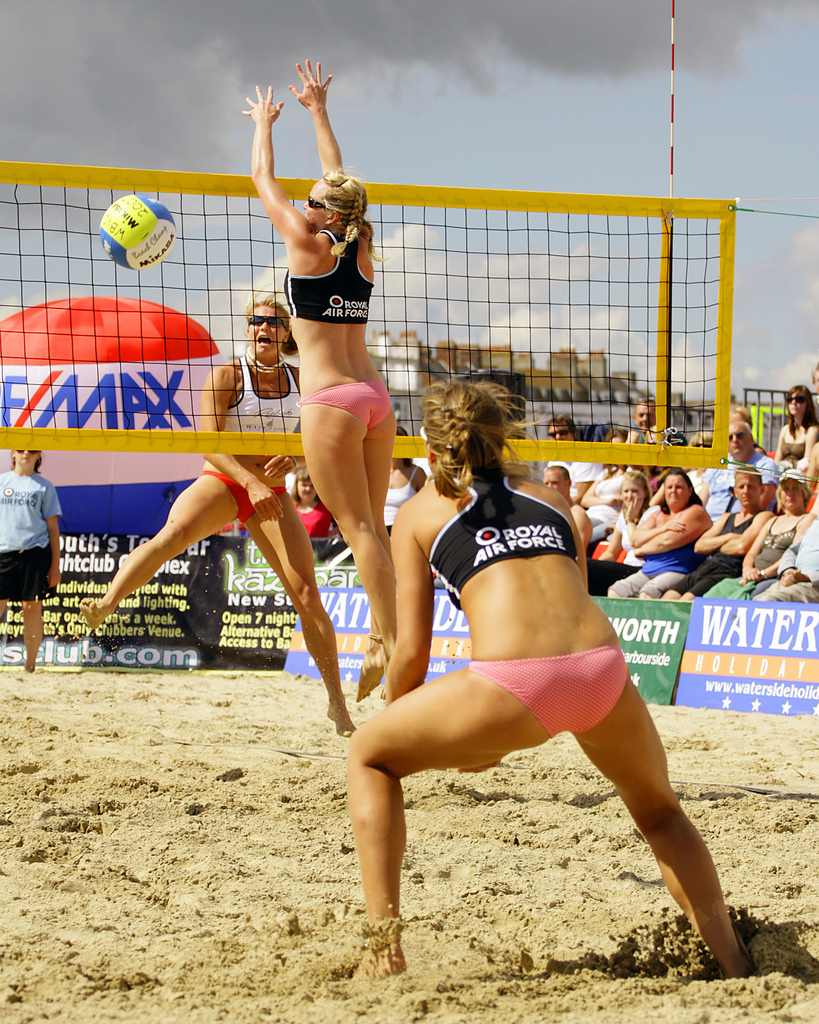
Johns (foreground) in action with her teammate Lucy Boulton at Weymouth, Dorset, UK, 2007

Denise Johns (born 9 December 1978) is a professional beach volleyball player. She was born in Luxembourg, grew up in the US, but competes for Great Britain.

== Early life ==
Johns was born on 9 December 1978 in Ettelbruck in Luxembourg. Her father Martin Johns is English, and she has one sister. Her family moved from Luxembourg to Ohio when she was 4 years old. She grew up in Copley, Ohio, and started playing volleyball at the age of 10. She attended Copley High School, where she excelled at swimming, track and volleyball.

She obtained a bachelor's degree in architecture from University of Cincinnati, where she concentrated on rowing rather than volleyball.

She graduated in 2002, and moved to Atlanta, playing amateur beach volleyball on the east coast of America. After success in those tournaments she moved to San Diego, California where she played on the AVP tour for four years.

== Career ==
She started playing on the AVP Tour in 2003, and with Jenelle Koester, won the 2003 AVPNext National Championships. In 2005, she and Alicia Polzin defeated both the second and third ranked teams on the tour in the same tournament.

She has competed in 42 AVP tournaments, 6 FIVB tournaments, and 22 various other tournaments. She was ranked 12th on the AVP after 2006. She obtained first place in the Weymouth Classic in 2006, 4th place in the Argentina FIVB Challenge in 2005, 2nd place in Mexico in 2005, and 1st place at the AVP Next Championships in 2003.

Her current volleyball team partner is Lucy Boulton. She currently trains at the UK volleyball HQ at TeamBath at the University of Bath, UK.

Denise has volunteered for Premiership 4 Sport, coached for the Volleyball England initiative and is also an ambassador for Go Spike

== Personal life ==
Johns lives in a 175-year-old cottage in Midsomer Norton, Somerset, with her husband, Jody Gooding, also a member of the Great Britain team. She still does some work as an architect in addition to her volleyball. Johns and Gooding were married on 4 September 2011 in a ceremony held on the beach in Folly Beach, South Carolina.

Awards
Preceded by Shelda Bede (BRA)	Women's FIVB World Tour "Most Inspirational"; 2010	Succeeded by Kerri Walsh (USA)
