= Tréméven =

Tréméven may refer to the two communes in Brittany, France:

- Tréméven, Côtes-d'Armor, in the Côtes-d'Armor department
- Tréméven, Finistère, in the Finistère department
