= Vefa de Saint-Pierre =

French explorer, writer

- Born: Geneviève de Méhérenc de Saint-Pierre; 4 May 1872; Plian, France
- Died: 1967 (aged 94–95); Sant-Brieg, France
- Other name: Brug ar Menez Du (Heather of the Black Mountains)
- Occupations: Writer, explorer
- Spouse: Joseph-Marie Potiron de Boisfleury
- Parents: Count Henri de Méhérenc de Saint-Pierre (father); Marie Espivent de La Villesboisnet (mother)

Vefa de Saint-Pierre, born Geneviève de Méhérenc de Saint-Pierre (or Vefa Sant-Pêr in the Breton language), or Brug ar Menez Du (bardic name) was a Breton explorer, reporter and author, born in Plian, France, on 4 May 1872 and died in Sant-Brieg in 1967.

She was the daughter of Count Henri de Méhérenc de Saint-Pierre and Marie Espivent de La Villesboisnet, a "pure heiress of the Breton nobility" and born in a castle in the Côtes-d'Armor. By turns a nun, reporter, novelist, author of poetry and youth fiction, Saint-Pierre was a global voyager and hunter travelling across North and South America and Australia who wrote enthusiastically about her adventures.

== Biography ==
Deciding as a young girl against marriage, Vefa (short for Geneviève) chose instead to pursue the only option available for an unmarried young woman of her time: religion. She joined a convent associated with the Oblates of Saint Francis de Sales in Brittany, located in northwestern France, and remained a nun for 15 years. It was in that religious capacity, during one or two missions to Ecuador, that she gained a taste for travel and adventure.

In 1905, Saint-Pierre left convent life without ever having made her final vows. To feed her need to travel, she left Brittany alone for North America - United States and Canada - where she renewed her passion for hunting (reportedly, she had received her first shotgun for her tenth birthday). Soon her exploits became legend; she killed a boar, as well as a moose that charged her, and grizzly bears, among others. It was on this trip that she met others from the Brittany region of France who had made a new home in Canada. As Saint-Pierre toured the world, she was also known to explore Quito, Ecuador in 1899, and she journeyed to Sydney, Australia in 1928.

In 1910, at 38 years of age, she married Joseph-Marie Potiron de Boisfleury, but the marriage failed, lasting only three months.

In France, Saint-Pierre is also known for having owned the Menez Kamm manor since 1908 when she bought it. There, from 1970 to 1976, she sponsored various Breton movements, both Catholic and communist. A vigorous promoter of the Breton language (which is of Celtic origin), she is quoted as saying, "Bilingualism is a huge advantage! Children must be taught Breton and then they will learn English in three or four months." She was known to translate the Breton language works into French, with the aim of promoting national awareness of her regional language and culture. She was known to be a close friend of philosopher Yann Fouere.

In 1930, she was admitted to the community in Brittany known as Goursez Vreizh as a bard under a new name Brug ar Menez Du (Heather of the Black Mountains).

In 1949, she was the first to use a bilingual notarized agreement in France, written in both French and Breton.

After Saint-Pierre's death in 1967, the Menez Kamm cultural center flourished for some years, but despite all the dedication and hard work to keep the manor open as a place to live and learn Breton ways, financial difficulties increased, and in October 1976, the center closed. The property was then returned to the Saint-Pierre family and, as of 2018, the manor and its land had become a farm.

== Selected publications ==
Saint-Pierre's works are primarily in the French and Breton languages.

- Les Émeraudes de l'Inca, fiction in collaboration with Fernand de Saint-Pierre, Paris, Les Gémeaux, 1923
- Iverzon gwelet gant eur Vretonez, report at the Eucharistic Congress of Dublin (1932), Moulerez Thomas, Guingamp,1933
- Several poems in Breton periodicals.
- Many letters from her travels.

== Bibliography ==
- Claire Arlaux, Une Amazone bretonne - Vefa de Saint-Pierre, Coop Breizh, 2000. https://www.franceculture.fr/oeuvre-une-amazone-bretonne-vefa-de-saint-pierre-1872-1967-de-claire-laux.html
- Arlaux, Claire (2000). Une amazone bretonne : Vefa de Saint Pierre 1872-1967 (in French). Spézet Gourin: Coop Breizh Keltia graphic. ISBN 978-2-84346-111-8.
- Arlaux, Claire (2016). Une amazone bretonne: Vefa de Saint Pierre : 1872-1967 (in French). Gourin: Éditions des Montagnes noires. ISBN 978-2-919305-87-2. OCLC 989521153.
