= Mézec =

- Pronunciation: pronounced [mezek]

Origin
- Origin: Breton
- Meaning: physician
- Region of origin: Brittany

Other names
- Variant form: Le Mezek

Mézec is a surname, and may refer to:

Mézec derives from mezeg which means physician in Breton. (cf. Mezeg)

- Sam Mézec - British politician and deputy of Saint Helier
- Pierre Le Mézec - Former mayor of Tressignaux
- Tanguy Le Mezec - Breton politician, spokesman of Parti Chrétien-Démocrate Bretagne
