= Étables-sur-Mer =

Commune in Côtes-d'Armor department, France

Étables-sur-Mer Staol
- Part of Binic-Étables-sur-Mer
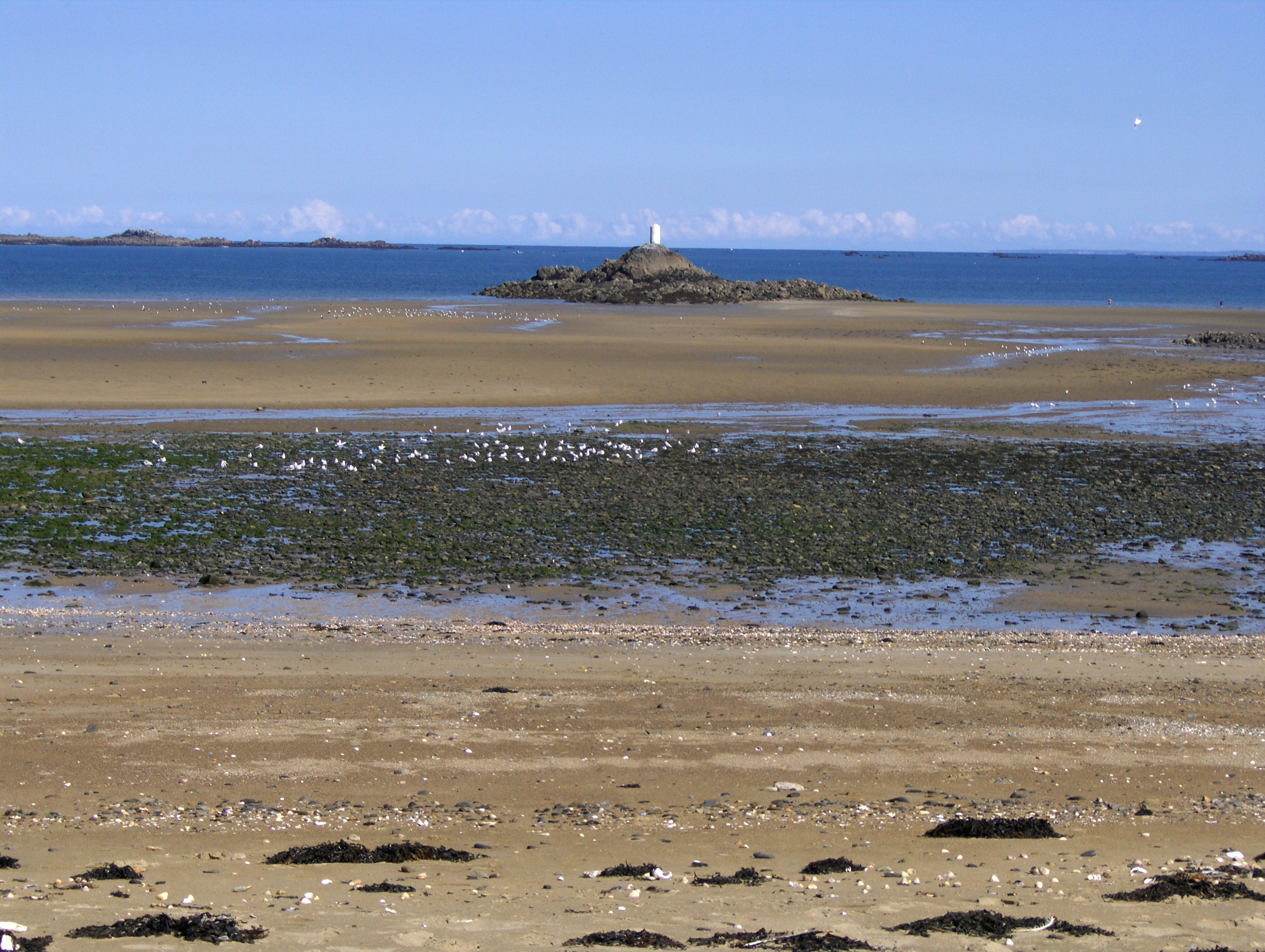
- Plage du moulin

- Flag Coat of arms
- Location of Étables-sur-Mer
- Location within France Location within Brittany
- Coordinates: 48°37′38″N 2°50′02″W
- Country: France
- Region: Brittany
- Department: Côtes-d'Armor
- Arrondissement: Saint-Brieuc
- Canton: Plouha
- Commune: Binic-Étables-sur-Mer
- Area^{1}: 9.38 km^{2} (3.62 sq mi)
- Highest elevation: 82 m (269 ft)
- Lowest elevation: 0 m (0 ft)
- Population (2022): 3,184
  - Density: 339/km^{2} (879/sq mi)
- Time zone: UTC+01:00 (CET)
  - Summer (DST): UTC+02:00 (CEST)
- Postal code: 22680
- ^{1} French Land Register data, which excludes lakes, ponds, glaciers > 1 km^{2} (0.386 sq mi or 247 acres) and river estuaries.

Étables-sur-Mer (French pronunciation: [etabl syʁ mɛʁ], literally Étables on Sea; Breton: Staol; Gallo: Establ) is a former commune in the Côtes-d'Armor department of Brittany in northwestern France. It is the seat of the commune of Binic-Étables-sur-Mer.

== History ==
It is notable as the birthplace of Saint Théodore Guérin (Saint Theodora).

On 1 March 2016, Binic and Étables-sur-Mer merged becoming one commune called Binic-Étables-sur-Mer.

== Population ==
Inhabitants of Étables-sur-Mer are called tagarins in French.

Historical population
Year	Pop.	±% p.a.
1962	1,928	—
1968	1,954	+0.22%
1975	2,041	+0.62%
1982	2,039	−0.01%
1990	2,121	+0.49%
1999	2,514	+1.91%
2022	3,184	+1.03%
Source: EHESS and INSEE

== See also ==
- Communes of the Côtes-d'Armor department
