= Binic =

Commune in Côtes-d'Armor, France

Binic Binig
- Part of Binic-Étables-sur-Mer
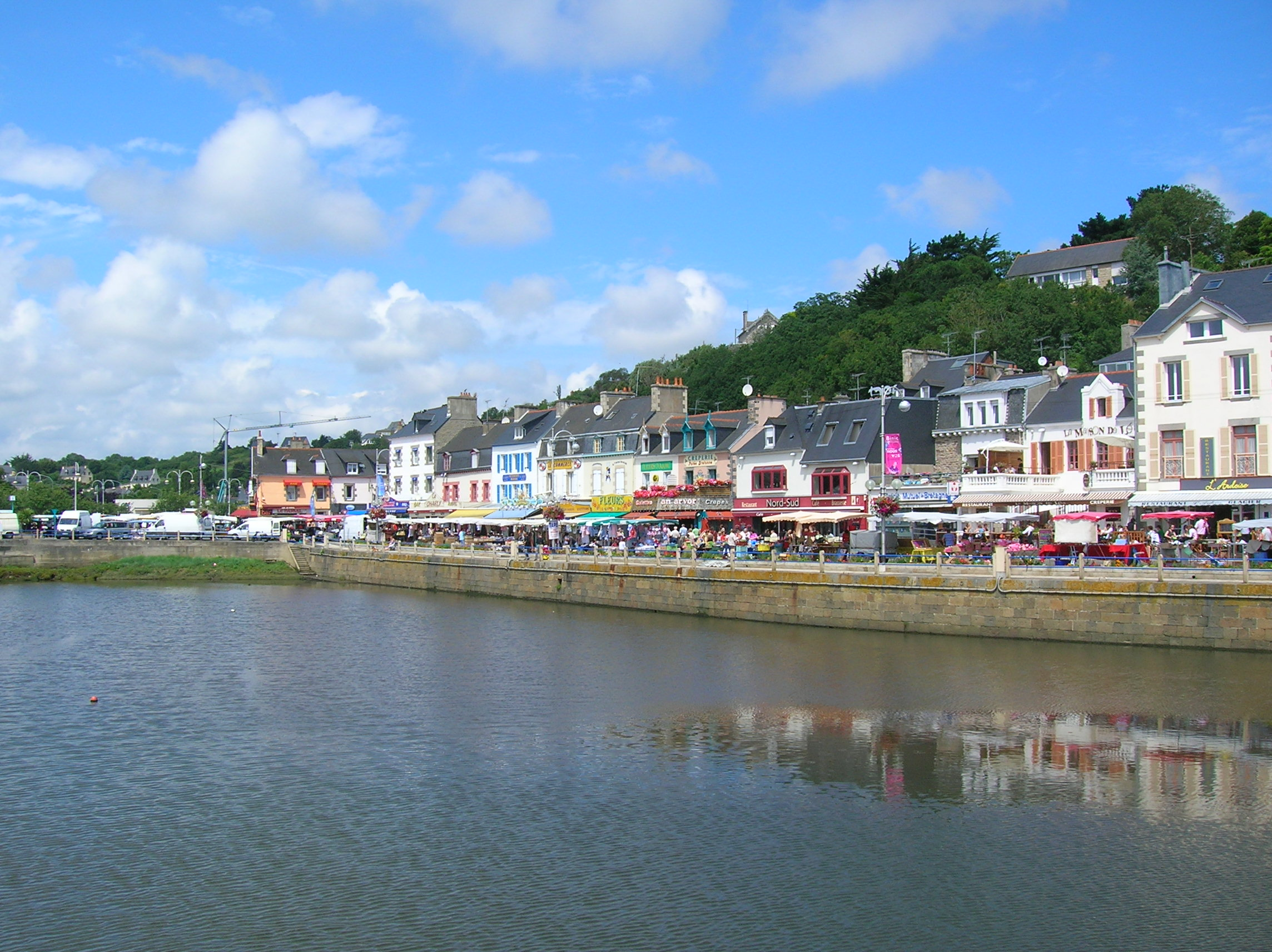
- Main quay

- Flag Coat of arms
- Location of Binic
- Location within France Location within Brittany
- Coordinates: 48°36′09″N 2°49′27″W
- Country: France
- Region: Brittany
- Department: Côtes-d'Armor
- Arrondissement: Saint-Brieuc
- Canton: Plouha
- Commune: Binic-Étables-sur-Mer
- Area^{1}: 5.96 km^{2} (2.30 sq mi)
- Highest elevation: 86 m (282 ft)
- Lowest elevation: 0 m (0 ft)
- Population (2022): 3,836
  - Density: 644/km^{2} (1,670/sq mi)
- Time zone: UTC+01:00 (CET)
  - Summer (DST): UTC+02:00 (CEST)
- Postal code: 22520
- ^{1} French Land Register data, which excludes lakes, ponds, glaciers > 1 km^{2} (0.386 sq mi or 247 acres) and river estuaries.

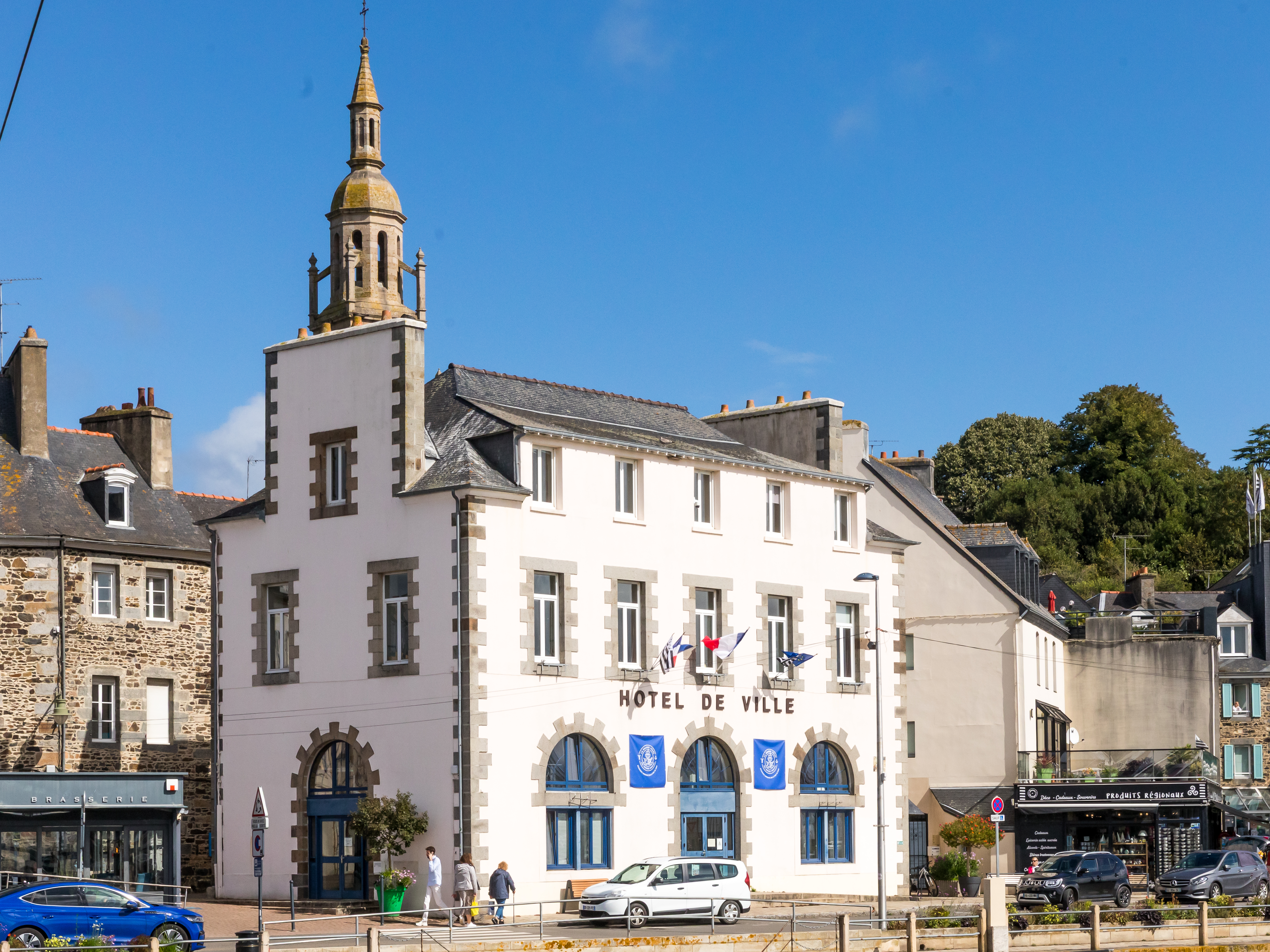
Binic's Town Hall

Binic (French pronunciation: [binik]; Breton: Binig; Gallo: Binic) is a small fishing port 12 km (7.5 mi) north of Saint-Brieuc on the north coast of Côtes-d'Armor department of Brittany, in northwest France. Once a commune of its own, Binic is now part of the commune of Binic-Étables-sur-Mer, following a merger on March, 01, 2016.

The name is derived from the Breton prefix pen (meaning head, chief, end or point) and the -ic suffix after the Ic river that runs through the village into the English Channel. Binic therefore stands for "the mouth of the river Ic".

The town has several nicknames, including City of Spray and, more recently, The Beauty Spot of the Cotes d'Armor.

== History ==
The recorded history of Binic dates to the Neolithic period (between 3500 and 1800 BC). Megalithic monuments festoon the area, such as the dolmen of Margot's Table; this however was destroyed in 1816 during work on the port.

In the Middle Ages, Binic (then called Benic) was a small village of no more than twenty houses. Despite its relatively small size, it was an appealing venue for fairs and markets and attracted people from the surrounding villages.

In 1821, Binic was granted municipal status due to the lobbying efforts of François Le Saulnier de Saint Jouan, a prominent ship owner in Binic, with the support of the Duchess of Angoulême (1778-1851), daughter of Louis XVI. At this time the town had 1,611 inhabitants. The boundaries of Binic, separating it from the parish of Étables-sur-Mer, were not finalised until 1840.

In the 19th century, Binic flourished. By 1845, it had become the most important French port for deep sea fishing. The port received 150 to 160 ships annually with activity divided between fishing in Newfoundland (island) and coastal trading vessels importing salt, wine, northern timber, flour and vegetables. At that time, Binic was the first cod fishing port.

The early 20th century brought significant change for the municipality. The French government signed the Entente Cordiale in 1904 which, among many other matters, extinguished French claims to Newfoundland, ending the port's thriving days. Overfishing led to the collapse of the fisheries in 1992.

Confronted with the threat of German submarines during World War I, the rising costs of weapons and increasingly stringent fishing regulations and competition from steam trawlers and schooners, ports of the region began to collapse. The depression in Binic lasted for thirty years, until new fishing methods arrived.

Saint-Brieuc Bay developed a specialty in scallop fishing that caught on in Binic. In 1992, Binic trawlers began unloading their catch in the new port in the neighbouring town of Saint-Quay-Portrieux. The port became dedicated to yachting.

Between 1906 and 1956, Binic was served by the railway department of Côtes-du-Nord (renamed Côtes-d'Armor in 1990), with a station on the esplanade of the Banche, built by engineer Briochain Louis Auguste Harel of Noah.

The railroad left important traces in Binic including two viaducts; the railway bridge known as the Chien Noir or La Hasée viaduct, and viaduct Beaufeuillage, facing the artisanal zone, located both the along the D4 towards Lantic.

On 1 March 2016, Binic and Étables-sur-Mer merged becoming one commune called Binic-Étables-sur-Mer.

== Population ==
Inhabitants of Binic are called Binicais in French.

Historical population

Year	Pop.	±% p.a.
1831	1,828	—
1836	2,229	+4.05%
1841	2,324	+0.84%
1846	2,407	+0.70%
1856	2,811	+1.56%
1861	2,673	−1.00%
1866	2,738	+0.48%
1872	3,458	+3.97%
1876	2,457	−8.19%
1881	2,231	−1.91%
1886	2,379	+1.29%
1891	2,222	−1.36%
1896	2,305	+0.74%
1901	2,247	−0.51%
1906	2,231	−0.14%

Year	Pop.	±% p.a.
1911	2,356	+1.10%
1921	2,342	−0.06%
1926	2,223	−1.04%
1931	2,141	−0.75%
1936	2,140	−0.01%
1946	2,241	+0.46%
1954	2,261	+0.11%
1962	2,099	−0.93%
1968	2,212	+0.88%
1975	2,326	+0.72%
1982	2,602	+1.61%
1990	2,798	+0.91%
1999	3,110	+1.18%
2022	3,836	+0.92%

Source: EHESS and INSEE

== Gallery ==
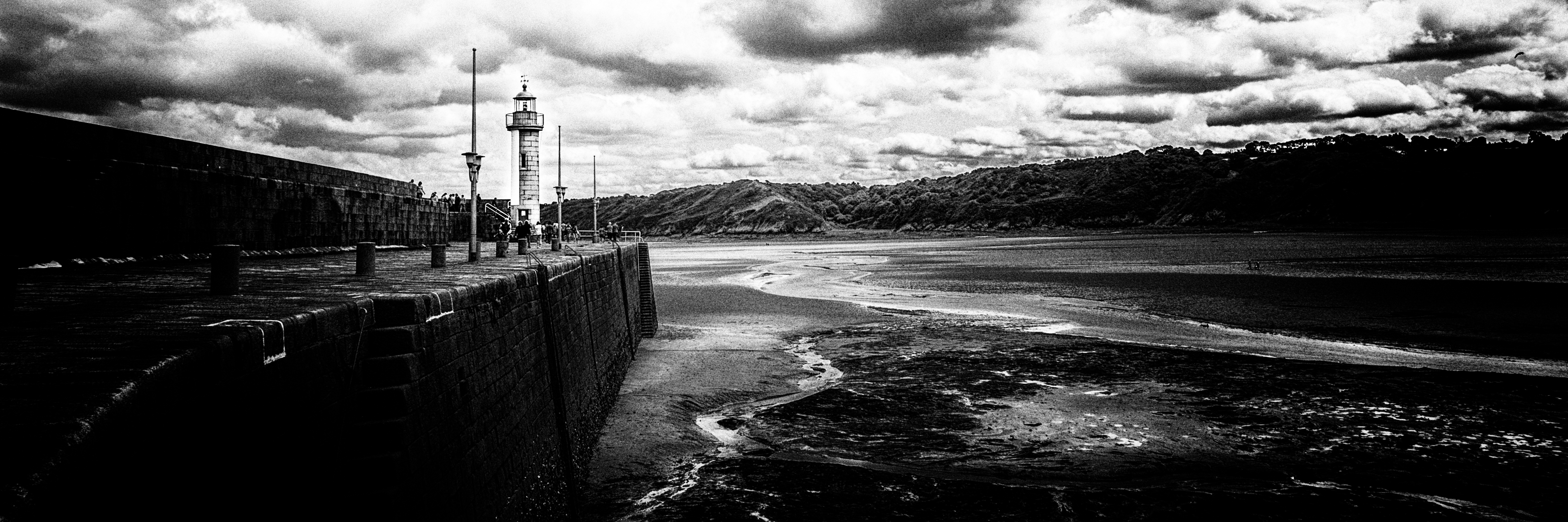
Le Phare de Binic (Panorama)

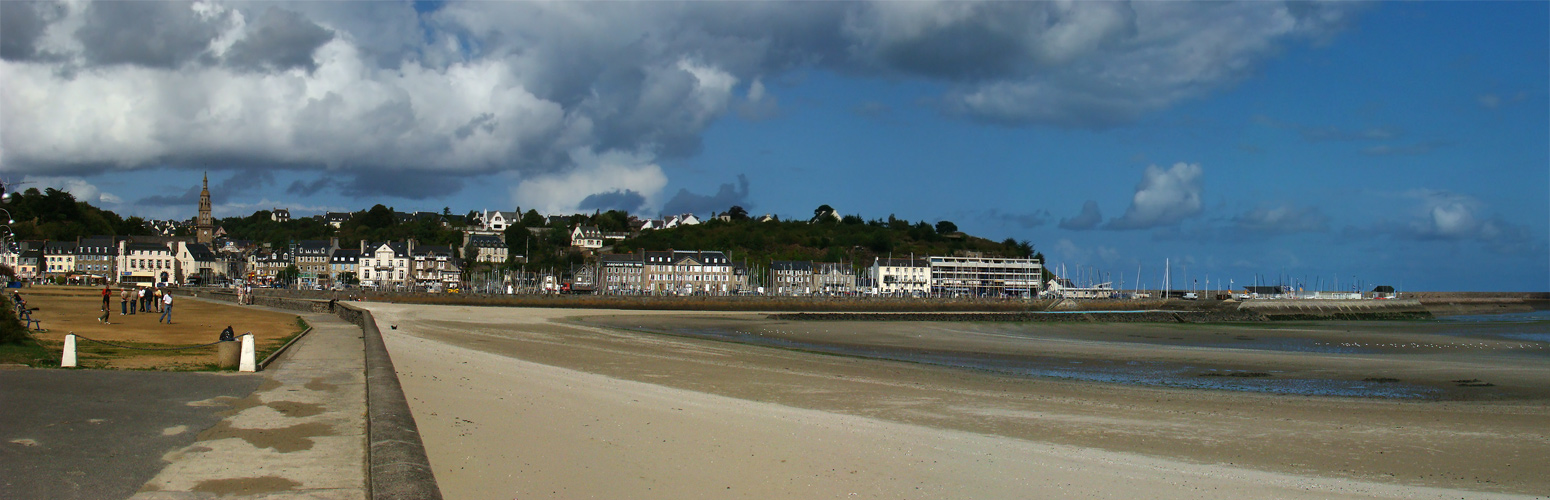
Sea shore at low tide

== See also ==
- Communes of the Côtes-d'Armor department
