= Le Faouët =

Le Faouët (Breton: Ar Faoued) can refer to two French communes in Brittany:

- Le Faouët, Morbihan in Morbihan
- Le Faouët, Côtes-d'Armor in Côtes-d'Armor

Note also Le Faou (Breton: Ar Faou) in Finistère.
