= Trévérec =

Trévérec Trevereg
- Commune
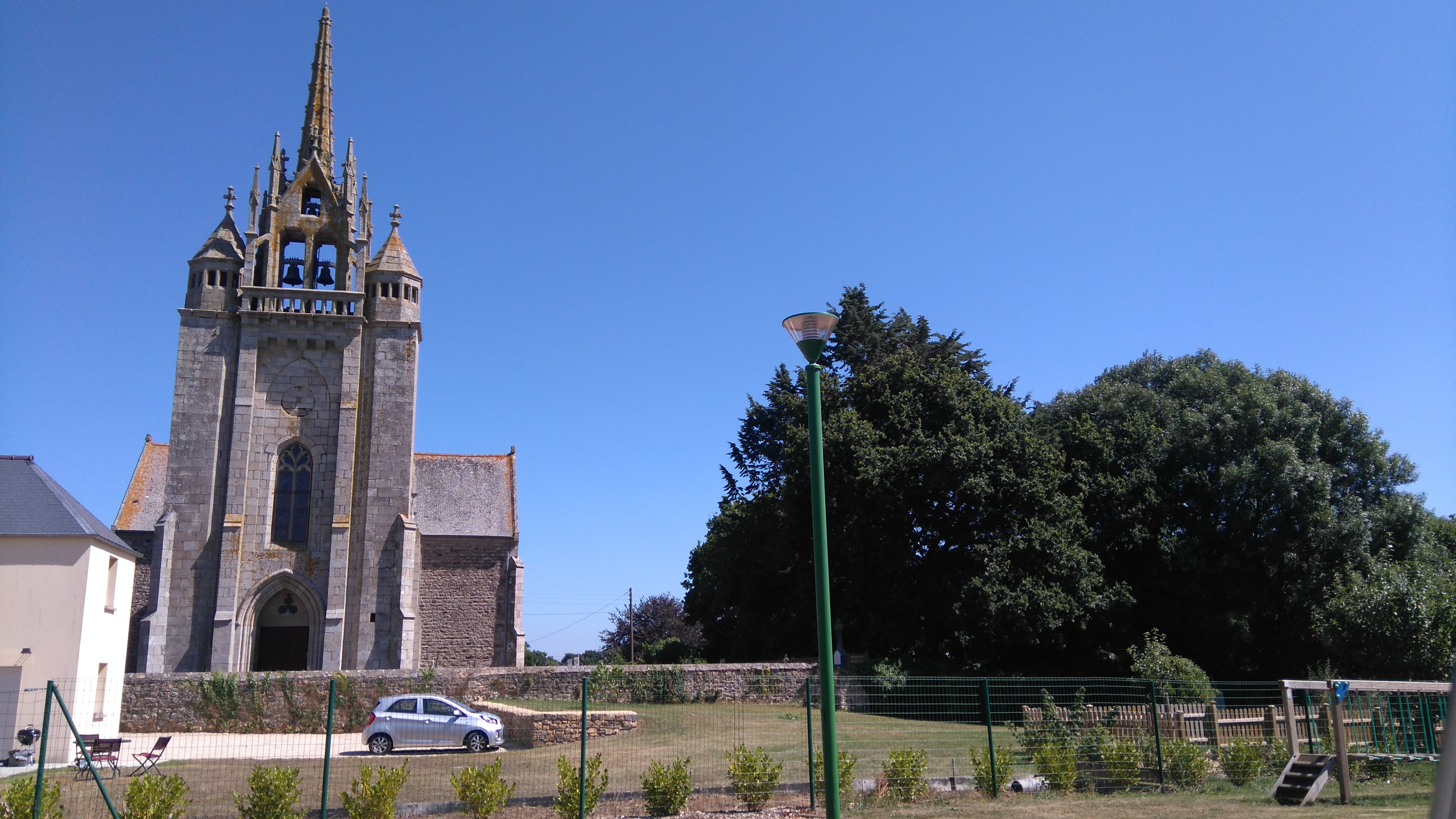
- The church of Trévérec
- Location of Trévérec
- Location within France Location within Brittany
- Coordinates: 48°39′18″N 3°03′29″W
- Country: France
- Region: Brittany
- Department: Côtes-d'Armor
- Arrondissement: Guingamp
- Canton: Plouha

Government
  - Mayor (2020–2026): Sandrine Geffroy
- Area^{1}: 4.33 km^{2} (1.67 sq mi)
- Highest elevation: 93 m (305 ft)
- Lowest elevation: 23 m (75 ft)
- Population (2023): 228
  - Density: 52.7/km^{2} (136/sq mi)
- Time zone: UTC+01:00 (CET)
  - Summer (DST): UTC+02:00 (CEST)
- INSEE/Postal code: 22378 /22290
- ^{1} French Land Register data, which excludes lakes, ponds, glaciers > 1 km^{2} (0.386 sq mi or 247 acres) and river estuaries.

Trévérec (French pronunciation: [tʁeveʁɛk]; Breton: Trevereg) is a commune in the Côtes-d'Armor department of Brittany in northwestern France.

== Population ==
Historical population
| Year | Pop. | ±% p.a. |
|---|---|---|
| 1968 | 201 | — |
| 1975 | 208 | +0.49% |
| 1982 | 178 | −2.20% |
| 1990 | 190 | +0.82% |
| 1999 | 174 | −0.97% |
| 2007 | 186 | +0.84% |
| 2012 | 220 | +3.41% |
| 2017 | 214 | −0.55% |
| 2023 | 228 | +1.06% |
Source: INSEE

Inhabitants of Trévérec are called trévérecois in French.

== See also ==
- Communes of the Côtes-d'Armor department
