= Saint-Gilles-les-Bois =

Saint-Gilles-les-Bois Sant-Jili-ar-C'hoad
- Commune
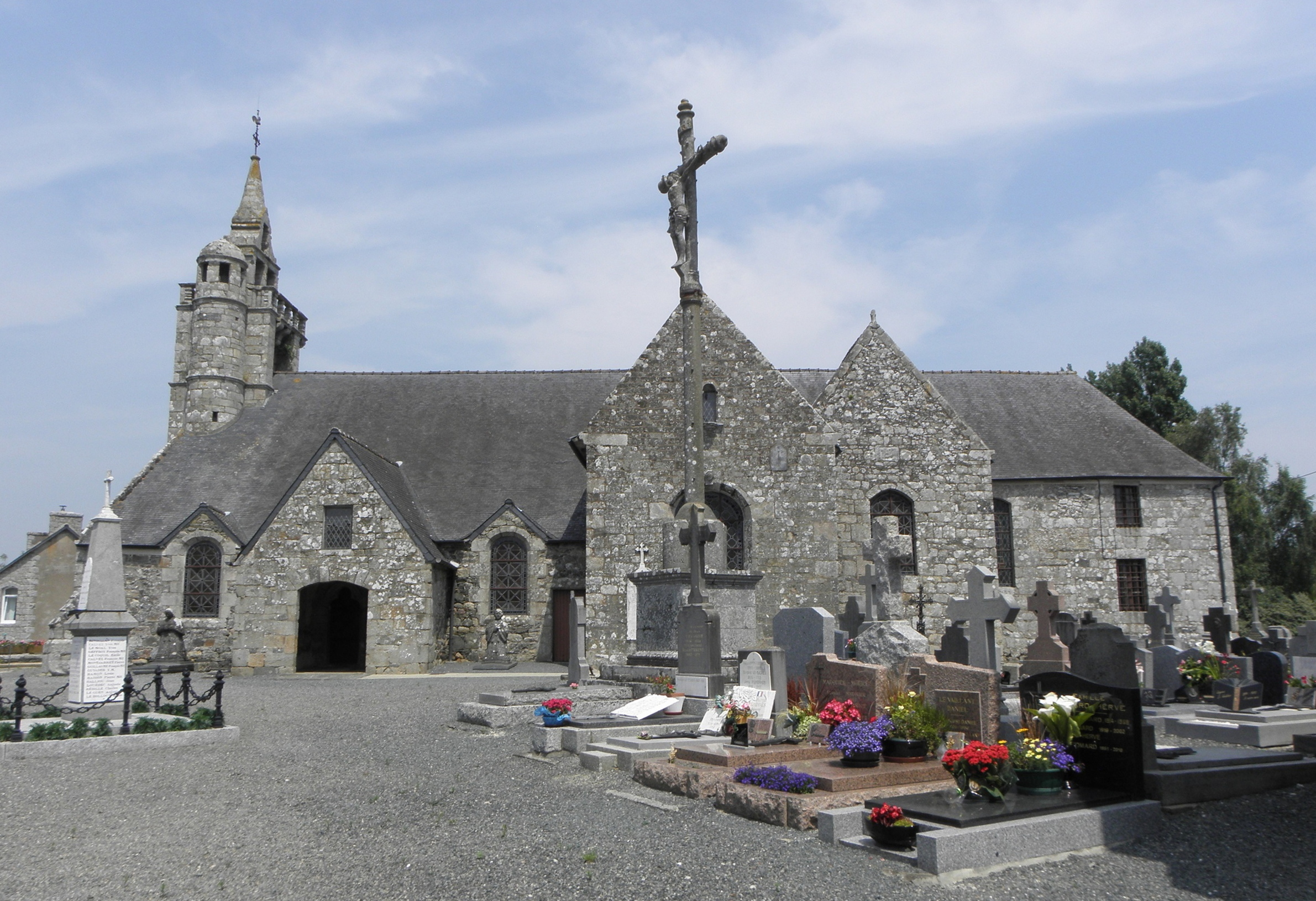
- The church of Saint-Gilles, in Saint-Gilles-les-Bois
- Location of Saint-Gilles-les-Bois
- Location within France Location within Brittany
- Coordinates: 48°39′02″N 3°06′06″W
- Country: France
- Region: Brittany
- Department: Côtes-d'Armor
- Arrondissement: Guingamp
- Canton: Plouha
- Intercommunality: Leff Armor Communauté

Government
  - Mayor (2020–2026): Nathalie Cosse
- Area^{1}: 9.45 km^{2} (3.65 sq mi)
- Highest elevation: 100 m (330 ft)
- Lowest elevation: 39 m (128 ft)
- Population (2023): 384
  - Density: 40.6/km^{2} (105/sq mi)
- Time zone: UTC+01:00 (CET)
  - Summer (DST): UTC+02:00 (CEST)
- INSEE/Postal code: 22293 /22290
- ^{1} French Land Register data, which excludes lakes, ponds, glaciers > 1 km^{2} (0.386 sq mi or 247 acres) and river estuaries.

Saint-Gilles-les-Bois (French pronunciation: [sɛ̃ ʒil le bwa]; Breton: Sant-Jili-ar-C'hoad) is a commune in the Côtes-d'Armor department of Brittany in northwestern France.

== Population ==
Historical population
Year	Pop.	±% p.a.
1968	512	—
1975	471	−1.19%
1982	451	−0.62%
1990	421	−0.86%
1999	401	−0.54%
2007	421	+0.61%
2012	406	−0.72%
2017	432	+1.25%
2023	384	−1.94%
Source: INSEE

Inhabitants of Saint-Gilles-les-Bois are called saint-gillois in French.

== See also ==
- Communes of the Côtes-d'Armor department
