= Tréguidel =

Tréguidel Tregedel
- Commune
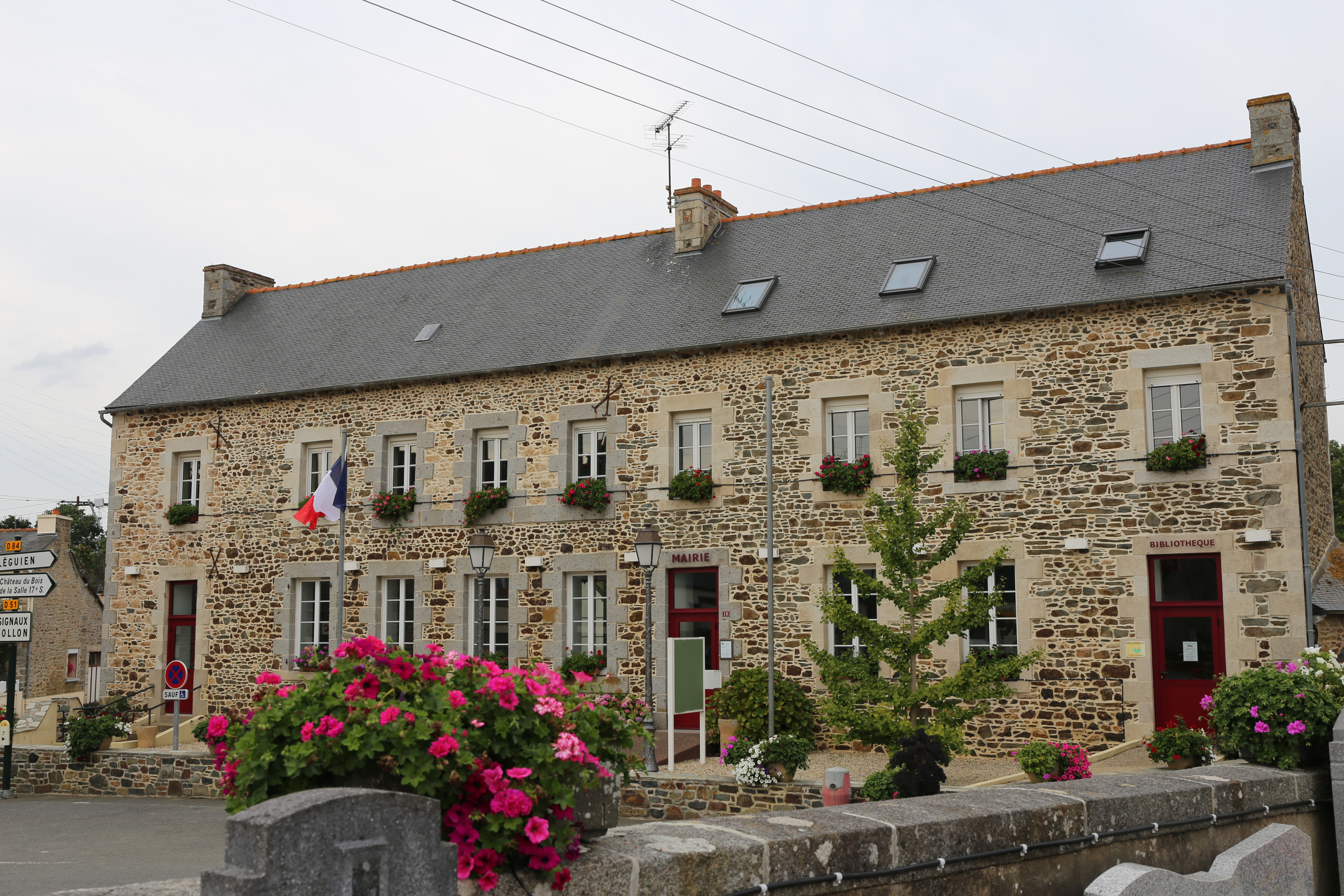
- The town hall of Tréguidel
- Location of Tréguidel
- Location within France Location within Brittany
- Coordinates: 48°36′09″N 2°56′33″W
- Country: France
- Region: Brittany
- Department: Côtes-d'Armor
- Arrondissement: Guingamp
- Canton: Plouha
- Intercommunality: Leff Armor Communauté

Government
  - Mayor (2020–2026): André Guillaume
- Area^{1}: 6.56 km^{2} (2.53 sq mi)
- Highest elevation: 117 m (384 ft)
- Lowest elevation: 82 m (269 ft)
- Population (2023): 630
  - Density: 96/km^{2} (250/sq mi)
- Time zone: UTC+01:00 (CET)
  - Summer (DST): UTC+02:00 (CEST)
- INSEE/Postal code: 22361 /22290
- ^{1} French Land Register data, which excludes lakes, ponds, glaciers > 1 km^{2} (0.386 sq mi or 247 acres) and river estuaries.

Tréguidel (French pronunciation: [tʁeɡidɛl]; Breton: Tregedel) is a commune in the Côtes-d'Armor department of Brittany in northwestern France.

== Population ==
Historical population
Year	Pop.	±% p.a.
1968	475	—
1975	418	−1.81%
1982	402	−0.56%
1990	500	+2.76%
1999	540	+0.86%
2007	645	+2.25%
2012	598	−1.50%
2017	615	+0.56%
2023	630	+0.40%
Source: INSEE

Inhabitants of Tréguidel are called tréguidelais in French.

== See also ==
- Communes of the Côtes-d'Armor department
