= Binic-Étables-sur-Mer =

- Commune
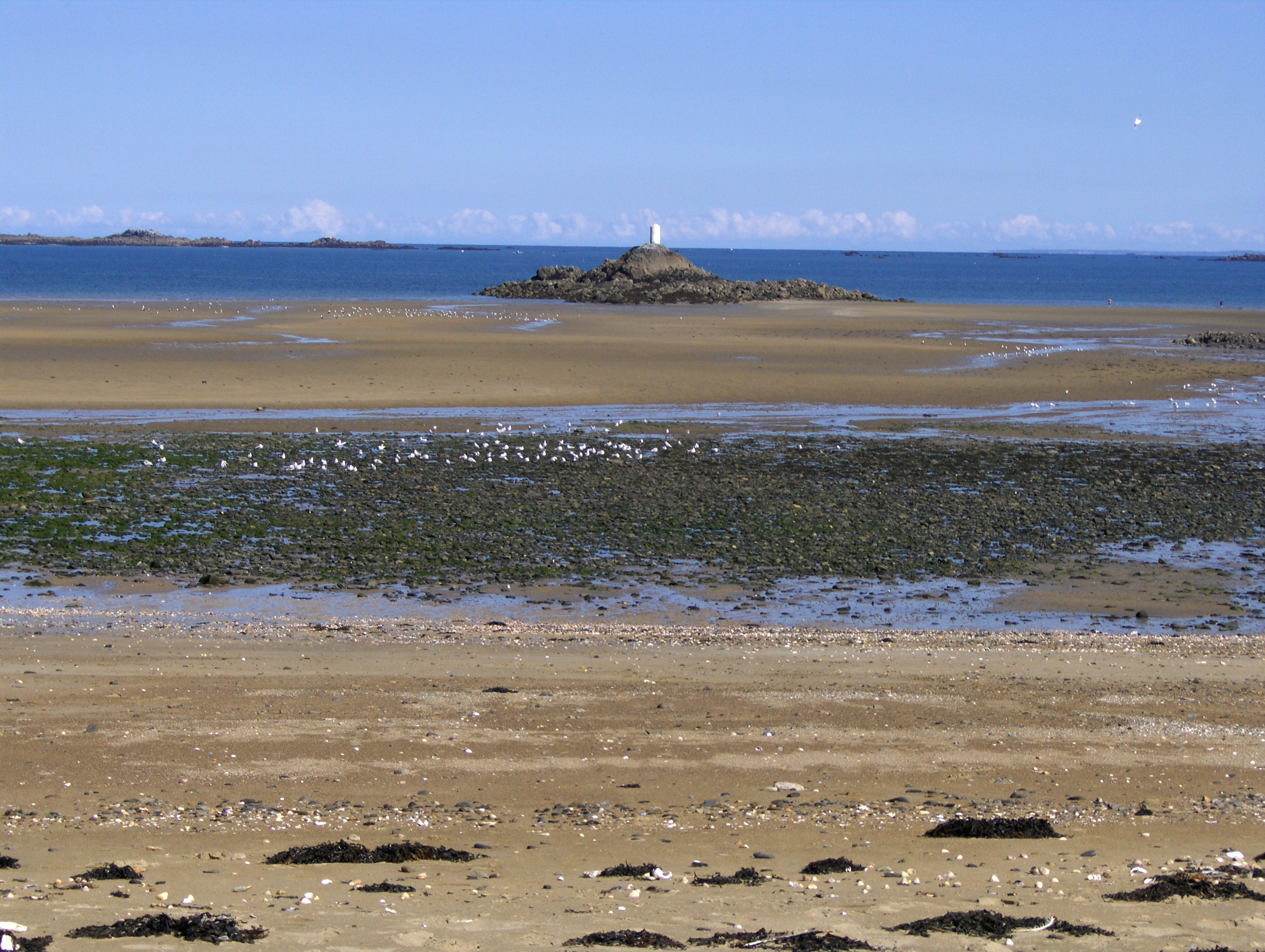
- Plage du moulin
- Location of Binic-Étables-sur-Mer
- Location within France Location within Brittany
- Coordinates: 48°37′00″N 2°52′20″W
- Country: France
- Region: Brittany
- Department: Côtes-d'Armor
- Arrondissement: Saint-Brieuc
- Canton: Plouha
- Intercommunality: Saint-Brieuc Armor

Government
  - Mayor (2020–2026): Paul Chauvin
- Area^{1}: 15.34 km^{2} (5.92 sq mi)
- Highest elevation: 86 m (282 ft)
- Lowest elevation: 0 m (0 ft)
- Population (2023): 7,041
  - Density: 459.0/km^{2} (1,189/sq mi)
- Time zone: UTC+01:00 (CET)
  - Summer (DST): UTC+02:00 (CEST)
- INSEE/Postal code: 22055 /22680
- ^{1} French Land Register data, which excludes lakes, ponds, glaciers > 1 km^{2} (0.386 sq mi or 247 acres) and river estuaries.

Binic-Étables-sur-Mer (French pronunciation: [binik etabl syʁ mɛʁ]; Breton: Binig-Staol) is a commune in the Côtes-d'Armor department of Brittany in northwestern France.

It is the result of the merger, on 1 March 2016, of the communes of Binic and Étables-sur-Mer.

== Population ==
Historical population
Year	Pop.	±% p.a.
1968	4,166	—
1975	4,367	+0.68%
1982	4,641	+0.87%
1990	4,919	+0.73%
1999	5,624	+1.50%
2007	6,402	+1.63%
2012	6,789	+1.18%
2017	7,068	+0.81%
2023	7,041	−0.06%
Populations of the area corresponding with the commune of Binic-Étables-sur-Mer at 1 January 2025. Source: INSEE

== See also ==
- Communes of the Côtes-d'Armor department
