= Lannebert =

Lannebert Lannebeur
- Commune
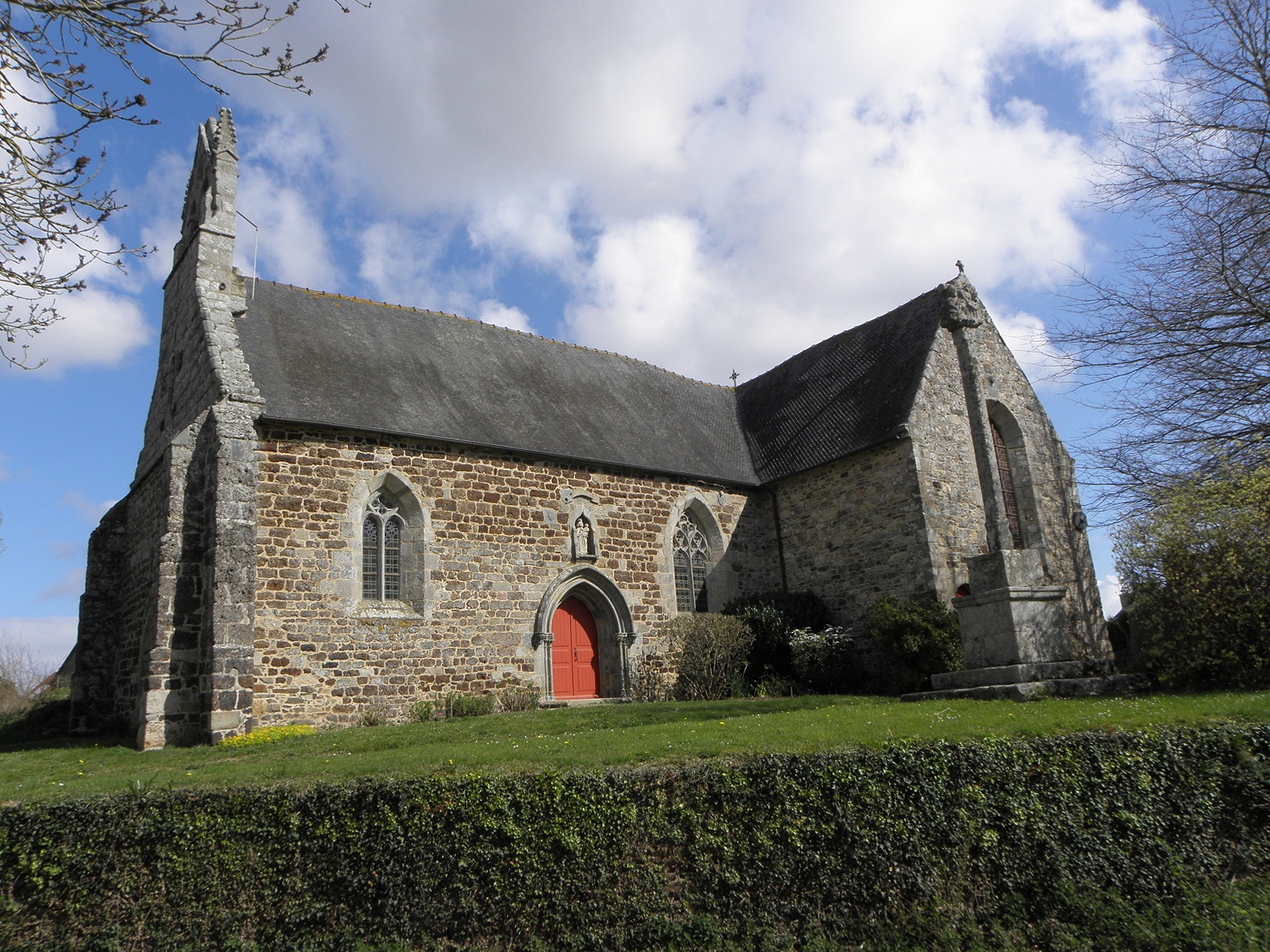
- The chapel of Notre-Dame of Liscorno, in Lannebert
- Location of Lannebert
- Location within France Location within Brittany
- Coordinates: 48°39′28″N 3°00′22″W
- Country: France
- Region: Brittany
- Department: Côtes-d'Armor
- Arrondissement: Guingamp
- Canton: Plouha

Government
  - Mayor (2020–2026): Jean-Michel Geffroy
- Area^{1}: 6.99 km^{2} (2.70 sq mi)
- Highest elevation: 92 m (302 ft)
- Lowest elevation: 32 m (105 ft)
- Population (2023): 423
  - Density: 60.5/km^{2} (157/sq mi)
- Time zone: UTC+01:00 (CET)
  - Summer (DST): UTC+02:00 (CEST)
- INSEE/Postal code: 22112 /22290
- ^{1} French Land Register data, which excludes lakes, ponds, glaciers > 1 km^{2} (0.386 sq mi or 247 acres) and river estuaries.

Lannebert (French pronunciation: [lanbɛʁ]; Breton: Lannebeur) is a commune in the Côtes-d'Armor department of Brittany in northwestern France.

== Population ==
Historical population
Year	Pop.	±% p.a.
1968	342	—
1975	339	−0.13%
1982	381	+1.68%
1990	353	−0.95%
1999	354	+0.03%
2007	399	+1.51%
2012	440	+1.98%
2017	443	+0.14%
2023	423	−0.77%
Source: INSEE

Inhabitants of Lannebert are called lannebertois in French.

== See also ==
- Communes of the Côtes-d'Armor department
