= Lantic =

Lantic Lannidig
- Commune
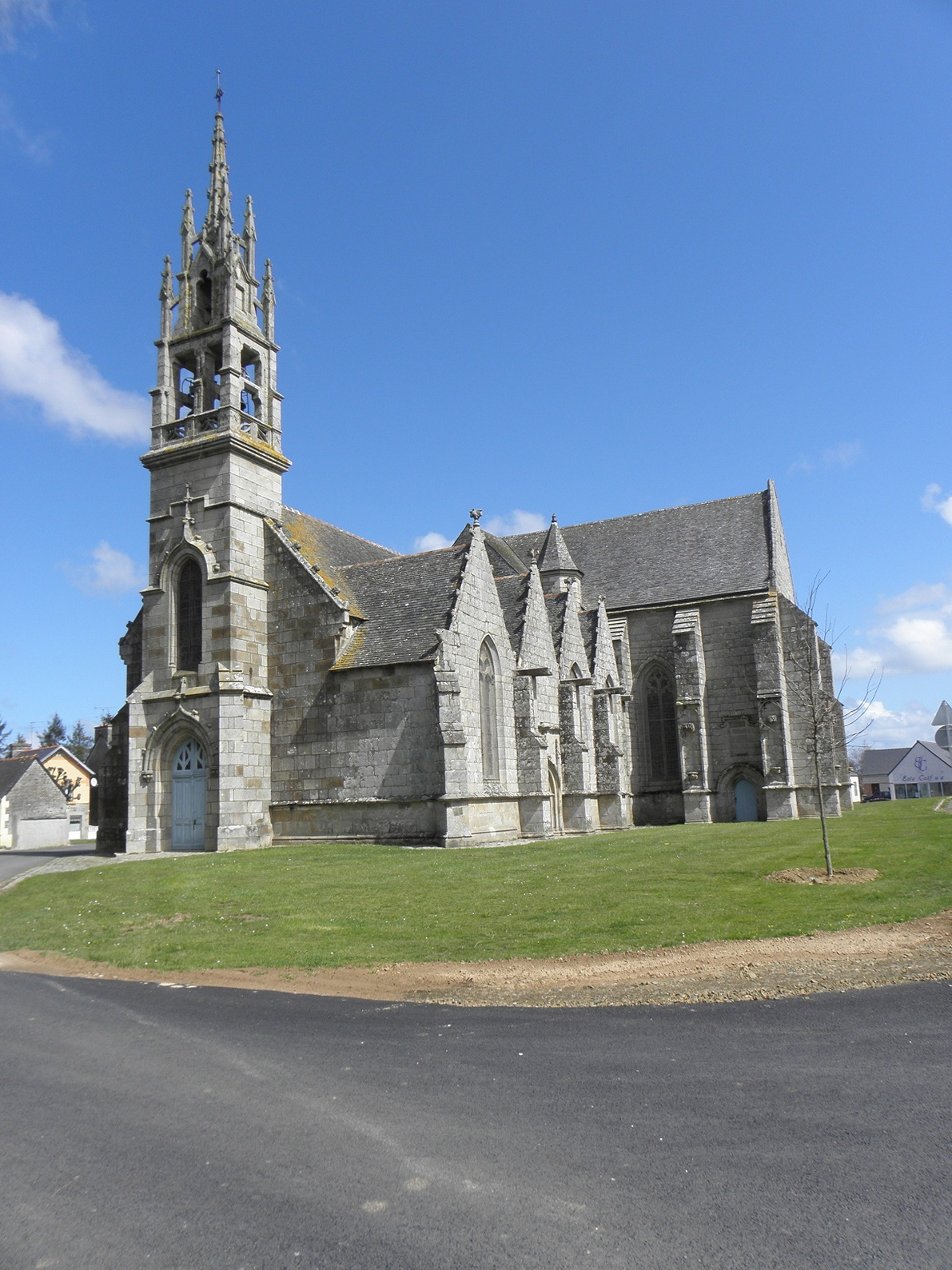
- The chapel of Notre-Dame de la Cour, in Lantic
- Location of Lantic
- Location within France Location within Brittany
- Coordinates: 48°35′59″N 2°53′48″W
- Country: France
- Region: Brittany
- Department: Côtes-d'Armor
- Arrondissement: Saint-Brieuc
- Canton: Plouha
- Intercommunality: Saint-Brieuc Armor

Government
  - Mayor (2020–2026): Christian Le Maître
- Area^{1}: 15.81 km^{2} (6.10 sq mi)
- Highest elevation: 109 m (358 ft)
- Lowest elevation: 12 m (39 ft)
- Population (2023): 1,814
  - Density: 114.7/km^{2} (297.2/sq mi)
- Time zone: UTC+01:00 (CET)
  - Summer (DST): UTC+02:00 (CEST)
- INSEE/Postal code: 22117 /22410
- ^{1} French Land Register data, which excludes lakes, ponds, glaciers > 1 km^{2} (0.386 sq mi or 247 acres) and river estuaries.

Lantic (French pronunciation: [lɑ̃tik]; Breton: Lannidig) is a commune in the Côtes-d'Armor department of Brittany in northwestern France.

== Population ==
Historical population
Year	Pop.	±% p.a.
1968	725	—
1975	722	−0.06%
1982	940	+3.84%
1990	1,075	+1.69%
1999	1,117	+0.43%
2007	1,407	+2.93%
2012	1,610	+2.73%
2017	1,672	+0.76%
2023	1,814	+1.37%
Source: INSEE

Inhabitants of Lantic are called lanticais in French.

== See also ==
- Communes of the Côtes-d'Armor department
