= Lanvollon =

Lanvollon Lannolon
- Commune
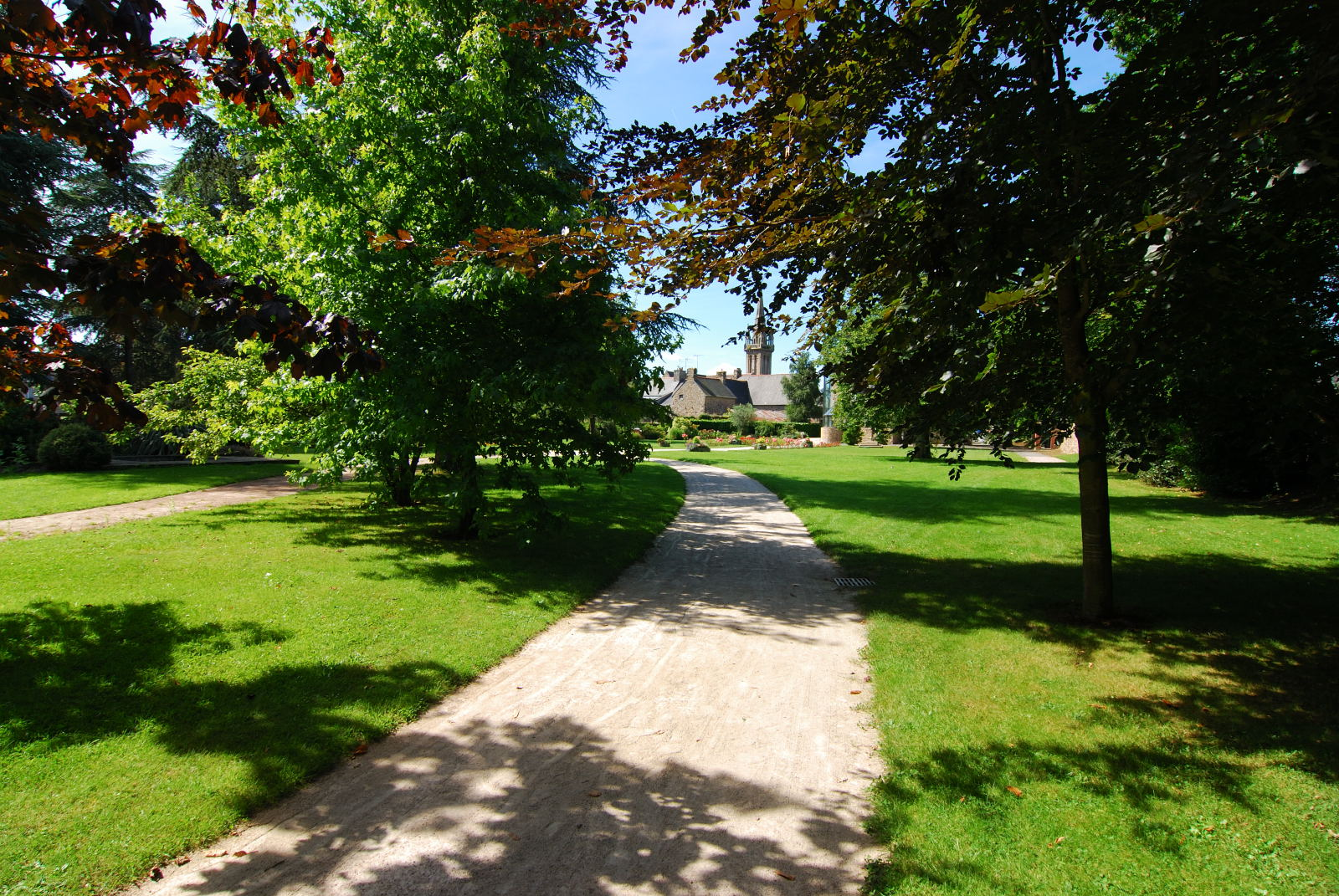
- A view of the park in Lanvollon

- Coat of arms
- Location of Lanvollon
- Location within France Location within Brittany
- Coordinates: 48°37′51″N 2°59′02″W
- Country: France
- Region: Brittany
- Department: Côtes-d'Armor
- Arrondissement: Guingamp
- Canton: Plouha

Government
  - Mayor (2021–2026): Alain Sapin
- Area^{1}: 5.01 km^{2} (1.93 sq mi)
- Highest elevation: 98 m (322 ft)
- Lowest elevation: 37 m (121 ft)
- Population (2023): 1,969
  - Density: 393/km^{2} (1,020/sq mi)
- Time zone: UTC+01:00 (CET)
  - Summer (DST): UTC+02:00 (CEST)
- INSEE/Postal code: 22121 /22290
- ^{1} French Land Register data, which excludes lakes, ponds, glaciers > 1 km^{2} (0.386 sq mi or 247 acres) and river estuaries.

Lanvollon (French pronunciation: [lɑ̃vɔlɔ̃]; Breton: Lannolon) is a commune in the Côtes-d'Armor department of Brittany in northwestern France.

== Population ==
Historical population
| Year | Pop. | ±% p.a. |
|---|---|---|
| 1968 | 1,111 | — |
| 1975 | 1,358 | +2.91% |
| 1982 | 1,423 | +0.67% |
| 1990 | 1,427 | +0.04% |
| 1999 | 1,388 | −0.31% |
| 2007 | 1,680 | +2.42% |
| 2012 | 1,743 | +0.74% |
| 2017 | 1,778 | +0.40% |
| 2023 | 1,969 | +1.72% |
Source: INSEE

Inhabitants of Lanvollon are called lanvollonnais in French.

== See also ==
- Communes of the Côtes-d'Armor department
