= Pludual =

Pludual Plual
- Commune
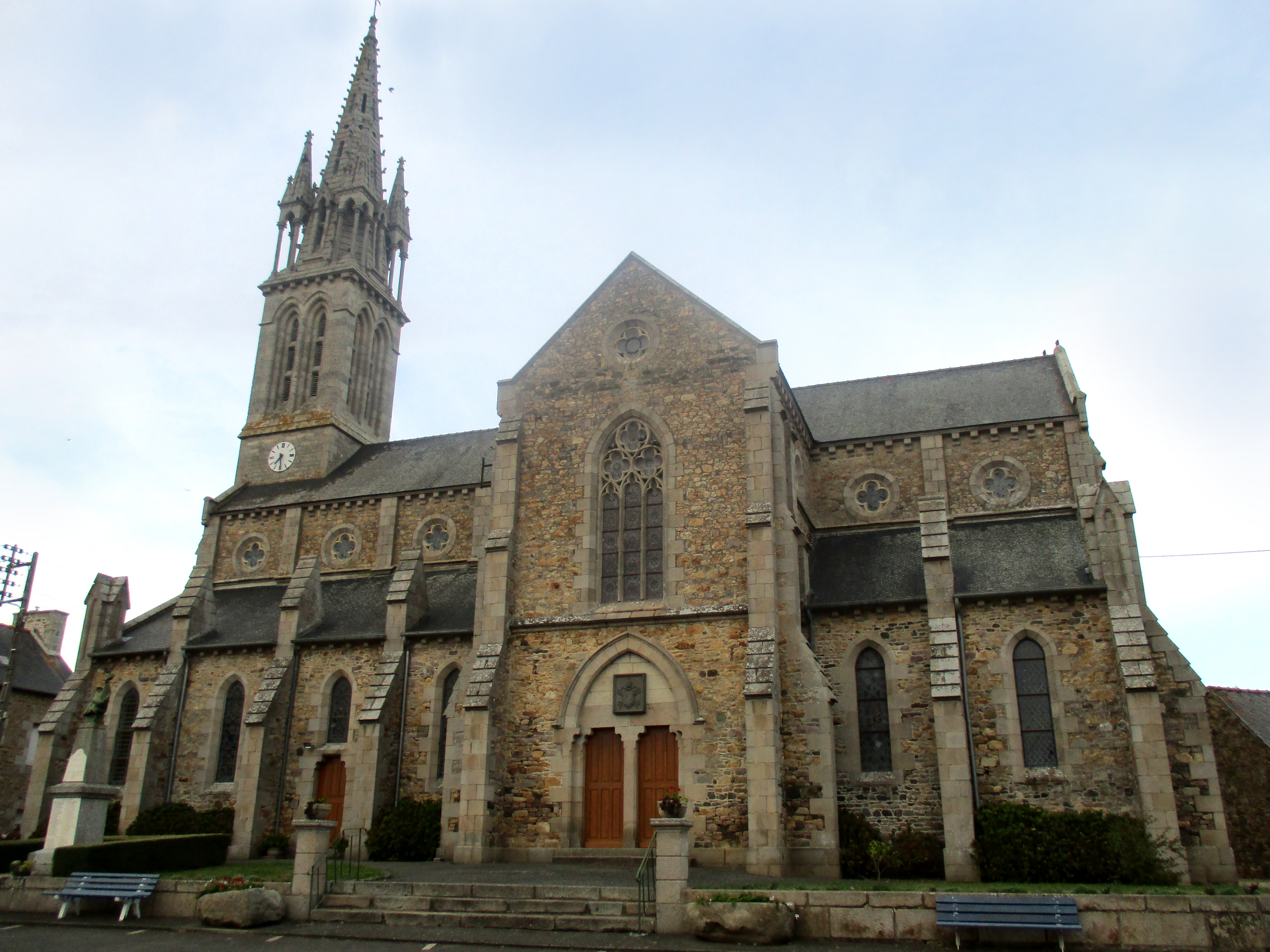
- The church of Saint-Mayeux, in Pludual

- Coat of arms
- Location of Pludual
- Location within France Location within Brittany
- Coordinates: 48°39′55″N 2°58′59″W
- Country: France
- Region: Brittany
- Department: Côtes-d'Armor
- Arrondissement: Guingamp
- Canton: Plouha

Government
  - Mayor (2020–2026): Yves Guillerm
- Area^{1}: 9.27 km^{2} (3.58 sq mi)
- Highest elevation: 96 m (315 ft)
- Lowest elevation: 35 m (115 ft)
- Population (2023): 738
  - Density: 79.6/km^{2} (206/sq mi)
- Time zone: UTC+01:00 (CET)
  - Summer (DST): UTC+02:00 (CEST)
- INSEE/Postal code: 22236 /22290
- ^{1} French Land Register data, which excludes lakes, ponds, glaciers > 1 km^{2} (0.386 sq mi or 247 acres) and river estuaries.

Pludual (French pronunciation: [plydɥal]; Breton: Plual) is a commune in the Côtes-d'Armor department of Brittany in northwestern France.

== Population ==
Inhabitants of Pludual are called pludualais in French.

== See also ==
- Communes of the Côtes-d'Armor department
