= Gommenec'h =

Gommenec'h Gouanac'h
- Commune
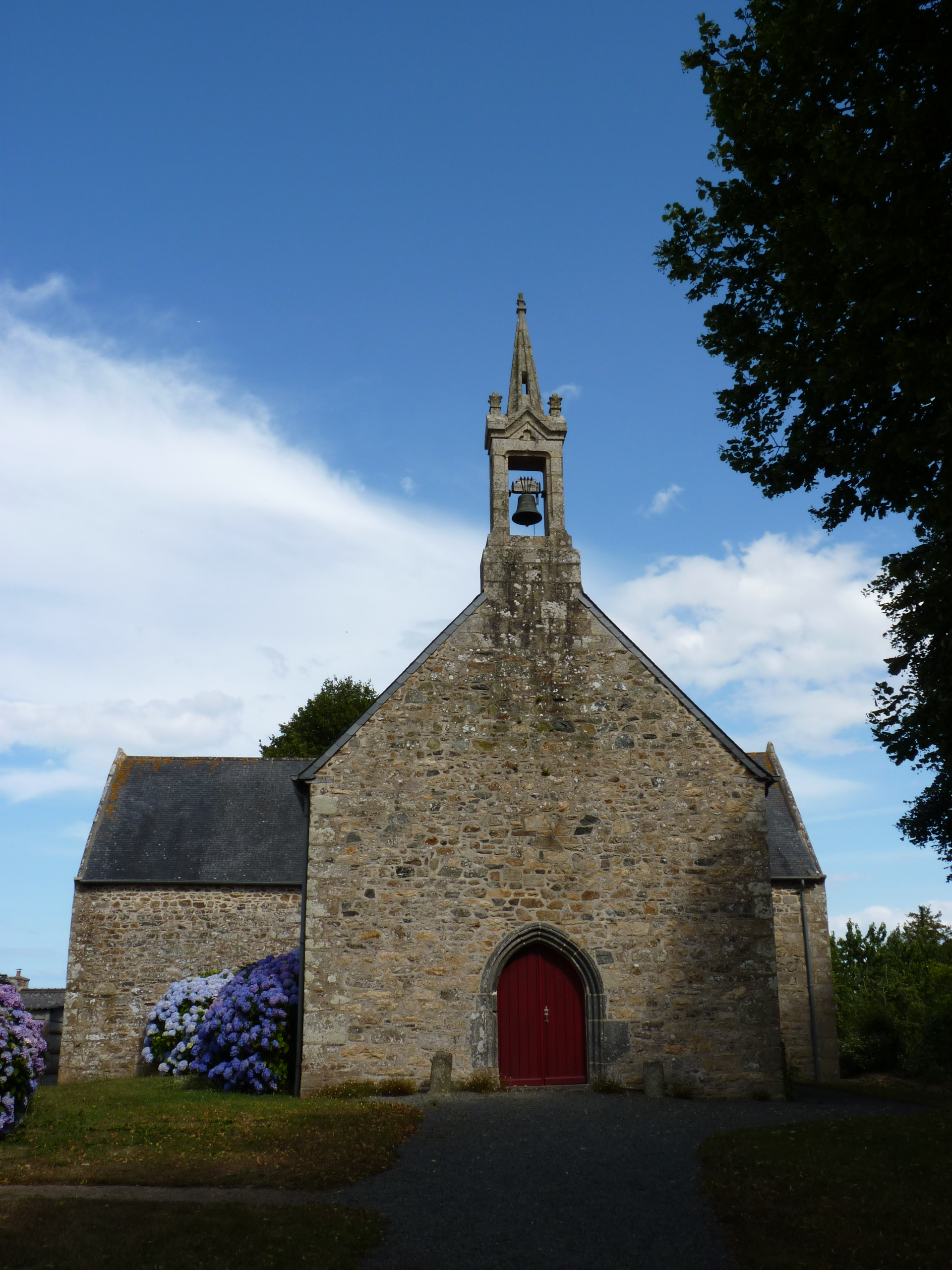
- The chapel of Notre-Dame de Douarnec in Gommenec'h
- Location of Gommenec'h
- Location within France Location within Brittany
- Coordinates: 48°38′27″N 3°02′52″W
- Country: France
- Region: Brittany
- Department: Côtes-d'Armor
- Arrondissement: Guingamp
- Canton: Plouha

Government
  - Mayor (2020–2026): Alain Herviou
- Area^{1}: 11.83 km^{2} (4.57 sq mi)
- Highest elevation: 91 m (299 ft)
- Lowest elevation: 32 m (105 ft)
- Population (2023): 551
  - Density: 46.6/km^{2} (121/sq mi)
- Time zone: UTC+01:00 (CET)
  - Summer (DST): UTC+02:00 (CEST)
- INSEE/Postal code: 22063 /22290
- ^{1} French Land Register data, which excludes lakes, ponds, glaciers > 1 km^{2} (0.386 sq mi or 247 acres) and river estuaries.

Gommenec'h (Breton: Gouanac'h) is a commune in the Côtes-d'Armor department of Brittany in northwestern France. Ce village possède une laverie, une auberge, une salle polyvalente et deux parcs pour les enfants.

== Population ==
Historical population
Year	Pop.	±% p.a.
1968	552	—
1975	513	−1.04%
1982	457	−1.64%
1990	421	−1.02%
1999	475	+1.35%
2007	503	+0.72%
2012	545	+1.62%
2017	558	+0.47%
2023	551	−0.21%
Source: INSEE

Inhabitants are called gommenechois in French.

== Etymology ==
Breton Etymology: gou (under) and menec'h (monks)

== Geography - Economy ==
This agricultural village, is situated at 13 km (8.1 mi) of magnificent touristic beaches of "La Manche".

Hamlets: Kerampalier, Kerbalan, Kerbillion-Bihan, Kerdoret, Kerdouanec, Kerhuel, Kerilis, Villepierre, Pors-Hamonet, Kervenou, Kermovezen, Kervernier, kerbars, Kerolland, Kergaff, Kerloas, Kerien, Kervily, Kerbost, Guern-Bras, le Guily, la Ville-Basse, la Trinité, Lochrist, Traou-Morvan, Traou-Gouziou, Traou-Hamon, Traou-Bistihou.

Gommenec'h is surrounded by four rivers: le Leff, le Gouazel, le Roz and le Goas Mab.

== Sights ==
The chapel of Douannec dating from the sixteenth century, with statues of the Virgin and Child, Saint Pierre, and Saint Eutrope in polychrome wood.

The church of Saint Guy with a wooden statue of Saint Joran.

The fountain of Saint Guy: eighteenth century granite fountain.

== See also ==
- Communes of the Côtes-d'Armor department
