= Tressignaux =

Tressignaux Tresigne
- Commune
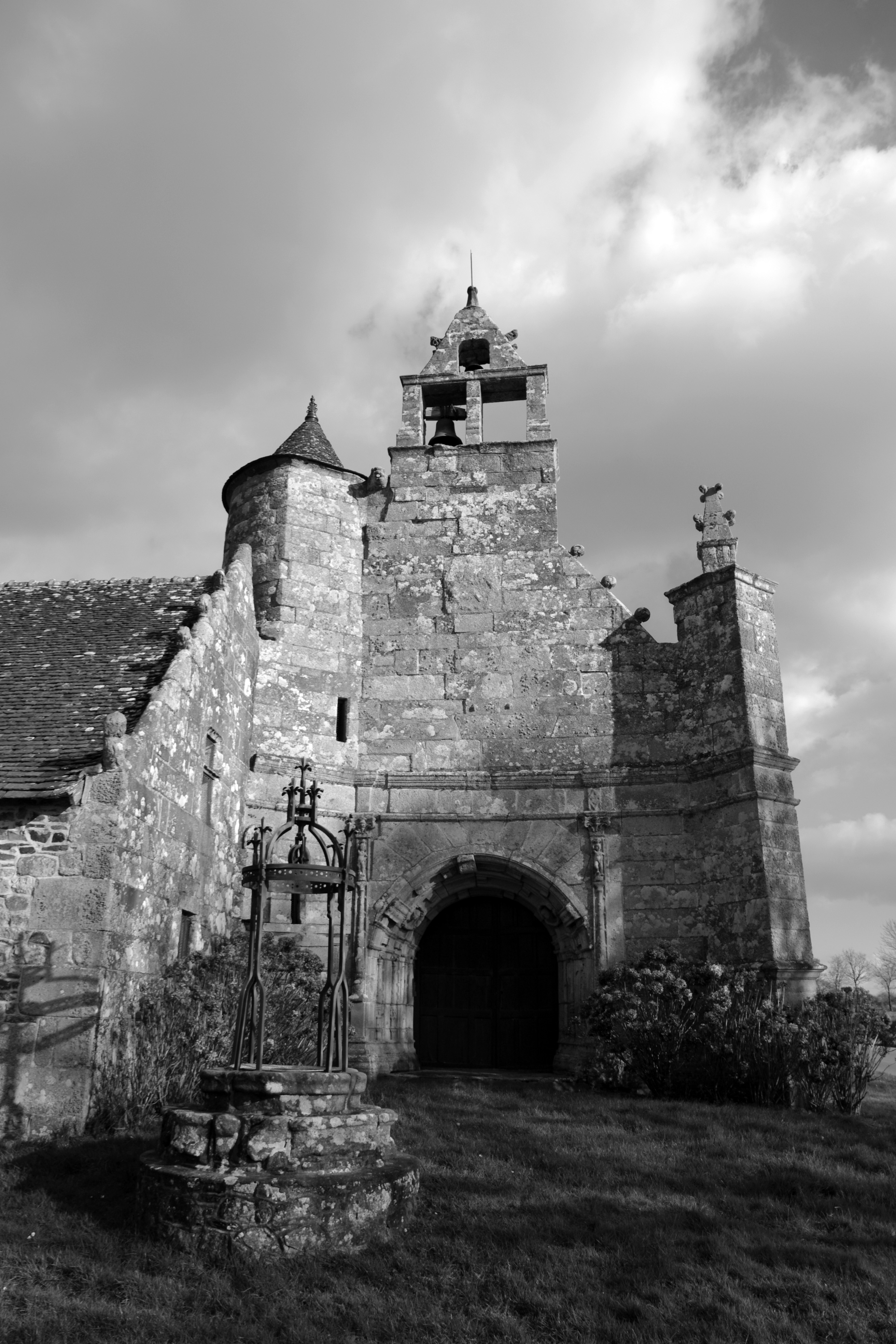
- The chapel of Saint-Antoine

- Coat of arms
- Location of Tressignaux
- Location within France Location within Brittany
- Coordinates: 48°37′00″N 2°58′56″W
- Country: France
- Region: Brittany
- Department: Côtes-d'Armor
- Arrondissement: Guingamp
- Canton: Plouha

Government
  - Mayor (2020–2026): Jean-Luc Guégan
- Area^{1}: 7.29 km^{2} (2.81 sq mi)
- Highest elevation: 106 m (348 ft)
- Lowest elevation: 48 m (157 ft)
- Population (2023): 670
  - Density: 92/km^{2} (240/sq mi)
- Time zone: UTC+01:00 (CET)
  - Summer (DST): UTC+02:00 (CEST)
- INSEE/Postal code: 22375 /22290
- ^{1} French Land Register data, which excludes lakes, ponds, glaciers > 1 km^{2} (0.386 sq mi or 247 acres) and river estuaries.

Tressignaux (French pronunciation: [tʁesiɲo]; Breton: Tresigne; Latin: Trisignala) is a commune in the Côtes-d'Armor department in the Brittany region in northwestern France.

The Chapel of Saint-Antoine, located in the village, was built in the thirteenth century and rebuilt in the sixteenth. Each year, a "pardon" is celebrated on the 3rd Sunday in August, attracting visitors to the village.

== Population ==
Historical population
Year	Pop.	±% p.a.
1968	445	—
1975	427	−0.59%
1982	470	+1.38%
1990	512	+1.08%
1999	534	+0.47%
2007	567	+0.75%
2012	644	+2.58%
2017	682	+1.15%
2023	670	−0.30%
Source: INSEE

Inhabitants of Tressignaux are called tressignaulais in French.

== See also ==
- Communes of the Côtes-d'Armor department
