= Tréméven, Côtes-d'Armor =

Tréméven Tremeven-Goueloù
- Commune
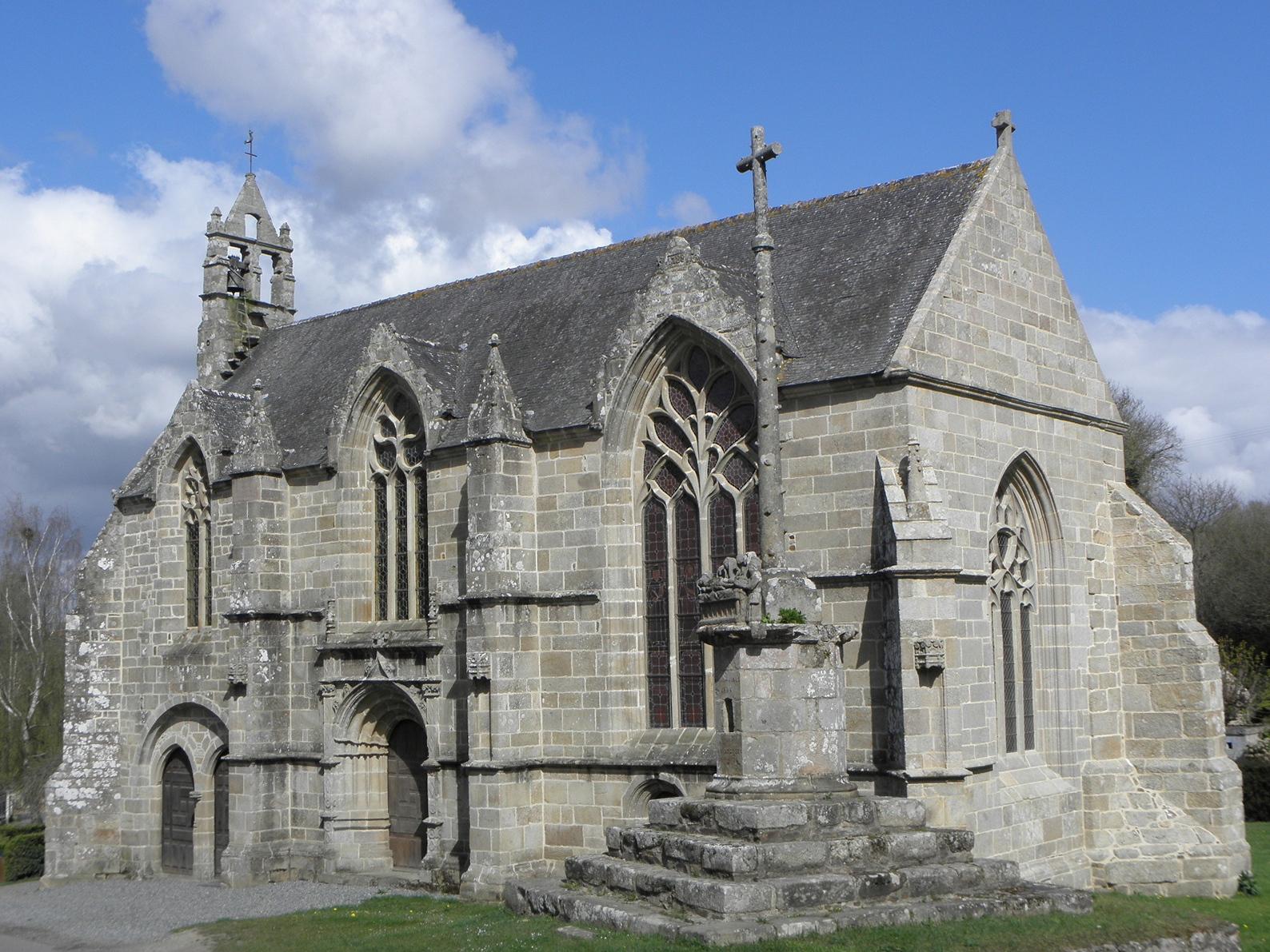
- The chapel of Saint-Jacques, in Tréméven

- Coat of arms
- Location of Tréméven
- Location within France Location within Brittany
- Coordinates: 48°40′25″N 3°01′39″W
- Country: France
- Region: Brittany
- Department: Côtes-d'Armor
- Arrondissement: Guingamp
- Canton: Plouha
- Intercommunality: Leff Armor Communauté

Government
  - Mayor (2020–2026): Yves Liennel
- Area^{1}: 5.12 km^{2} (1.98 sq mi)
- Highest elevation: 87 m (285 ft)
- Lowest elevation: 20 m (66 ft)
- Population (2023): 362
  - Density: 70.7/km^{2} (183/sq mi)
- Time zone: UTC+01:00 (CET)
  - Summer (DST): UTC+02:00 (CEST)
- INSEE/Postal code: 22370 /22290
- ^{1} French Land Register data, which excludes lakes, ponds, glaciers > 1 km^{2} (0.386 sq mi or 247 acres) and river estuaries.

Tréméven (French pronunciation: [tʁemevɛ̃]; Breton: Tremeven-Goueloù) is a commune in the Côtes-d'Armor department of Brittany in northwestern France.

== Population ==
Inhabitants of Tréméven are called Trémévénais in French.

Historical population
| Year | Pop. | ±% p.a. |
|---|---|---|
| 1968 | 311 | — |
| 1975 | 290 | −0.99% |
| 1982 | 247 | −2.27% |
| 1990 | 286 | +1.85% |
| 1999 | 277 | −0.35% |
| 2007 | 330 | +2.21% |
| 2012 | 354 | +1.41% |
| 2017 | 341 | −0.75% |
| 2023 | 362 | +1.00% |
Source: INSEE

== See also ==
- Communes of the Côtes-d'Armor department
