= Le Faouët, Côtes-d'Armor =

Le Faouët Ar Faoued
- Commune
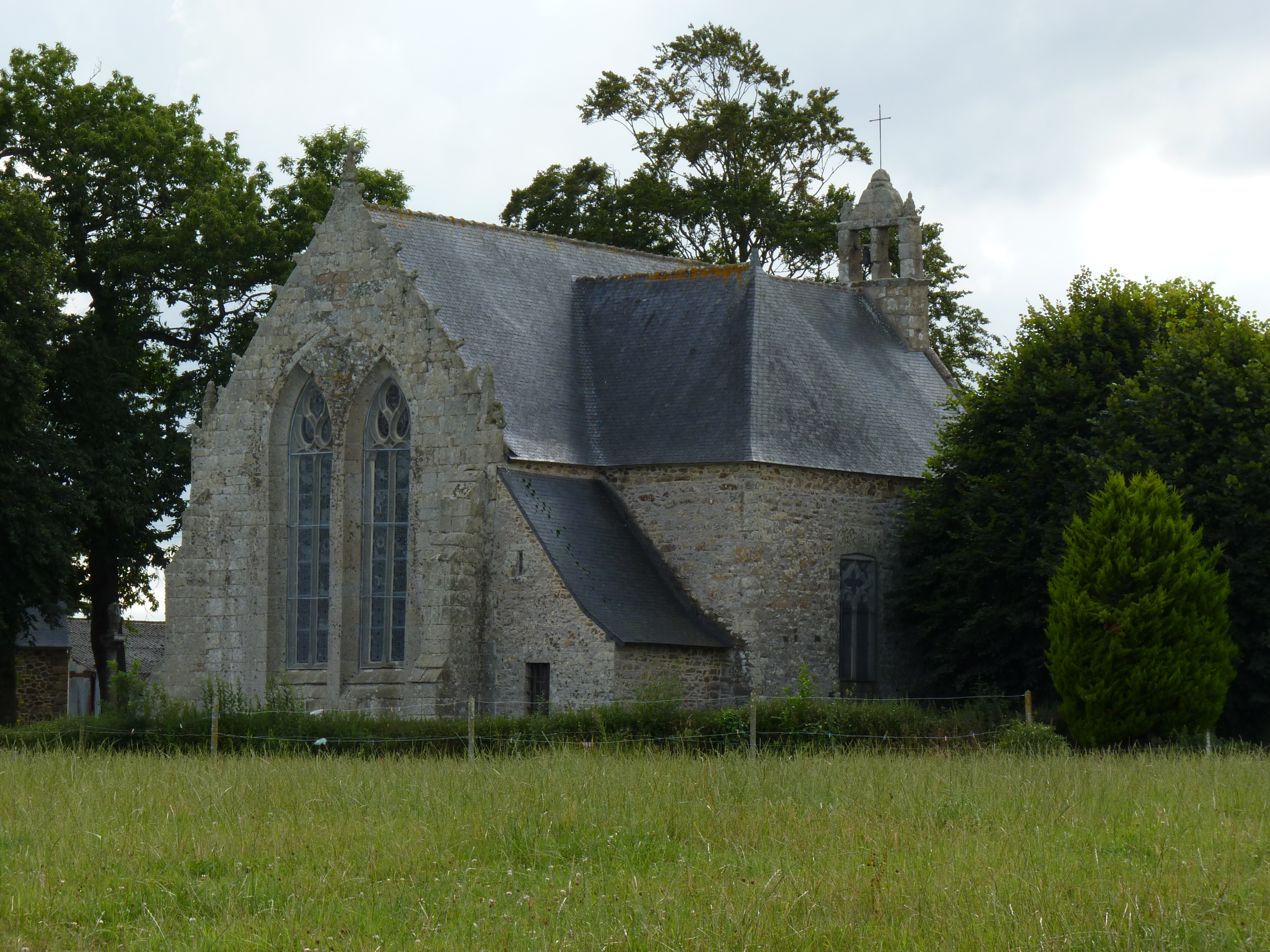
- The chapel of Notre-Dame de Kergrist in Le Faouët
- Location of Le Faouët
- Location within France Location within Brittany
- Coordinates: 48°41′02″N 3°04′21″W
- Country: France
- Region: Brittany
- Department: Côtes-d'Armor
- Arrondissement: Guingamp
- Canton: Plouha
- Intercommunality: Leff Armor Communauté

Government
  - Mayor (2022–2026): Thierry Le Gonidec
- Area^{1}: 7.55 km^{2} (2.92 sq mi)
- Highest elevation: 96 m (315 ft)
- Lowest elevation: 17 m (56 ft)
- Population (2023): 412
  - Density: 54.6/km^{2} (141/sq mi)
- Time zone: UTC+01:00 (CET)
  - Summer (DST): UTC+02:00 (CEST)
- INSEE/Postal code: 22057 /22290
- ^{1} French Land Register data, which excludes lakes, ponds, glaciers > 1 km^{2} (0.386 sq mi or 247 acres) and river estuaries.

Le Faouët (French pronunciation: [lə fawɛt]; Breton: Ar Faoued) is a commune in the Côtes-d'Armor department of Brittany in northwestern France.

== Population ==
Historical population
Year	Pop.	±% p.a.
1968	450	—
1975	346	−3.68%
1982	319	−1.15%
1990	250	−3.00%
1999	273	+0.98%
2007	290	+0.76%
2012	325	+2.31%
2017	396	+4.03%
2023	412	+0.66%
Source: INSEE

Inhabitants of Le Faouët are called faouëtiens in French.

== See also ==
- Communes of the Côtes-d'Armor department
