= Pléguien =

Pléguien Plian
- Commune
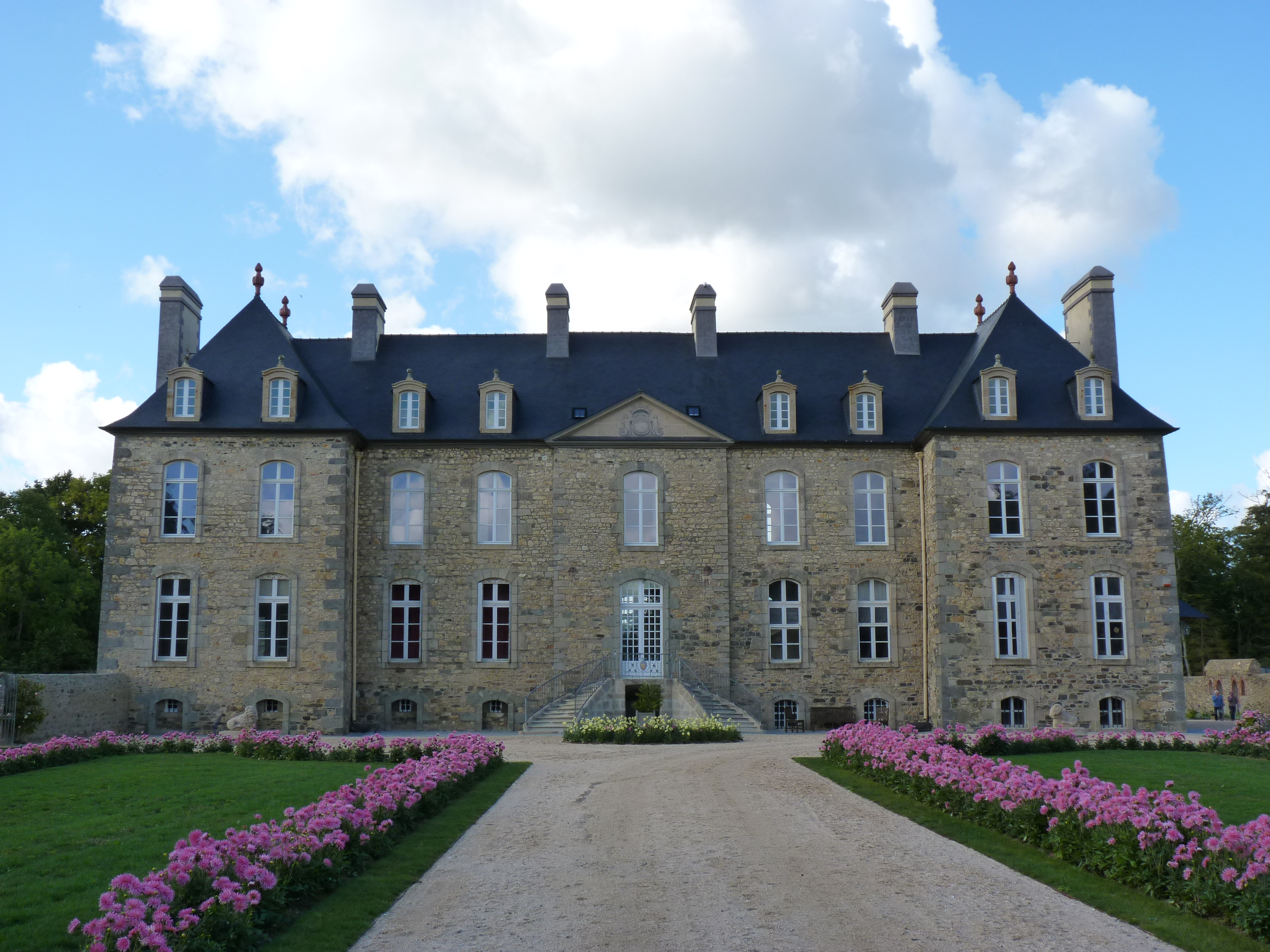
- The château of the Bois de la Salle, in Pléguien
- Location of Pléguien
- Location within France Location within Brittany
- Coordinates: 48°38′07″N 2°56′19″W
- Country: France
- Region: Brittany
- Department: Côtes-d'Armor
- Arrondissement: Guingamp
- Canton: Plouha

Government
  - Mayor (2020–2026): Philippe Le Goux
- Area^{1}: 15.48 km^{2} (5.98 sq mi)
- Highest elevation: 109 m (358 ft)
- Lowest elevation: 52 m (171 ft)
- Population (2023): 1,443
  - Density: 93.22/km^{2} (241.4/sq mi)
- Time zone: UTC+01:00 (CET)
  - Summer (DST): UTC+02:00 (CEST)
- INSEE/Postal code: 22177 /22290
- ^{1} French Land Register data, which excludes lakes, ponds, glaciers > 1 km^{2} (0.386 sq mi or 247 acres) and river estuaries.

Pléguien (French pronunciation: [pleɡjɛ̃]; Breton: Plian; Gallo: Plégien) is a commune in the Côtes-d'Armor department of Brittany in northwestern France. The number of housing of Pléguien was estimated at 630 in 2007. These accommodations of Pléguien consist of 466 main homes, 133 secondary residences and 31 vacant accommodations.

== Population ==
Historical population
Year	Pop.	±% p.a.
1968	916	—
1975	826	−1.47%
1982	816	−0.17%
1990	824	+0.12%
1999	1,011	+2.30%
2007	1,089	+0.93%
2012	1,264	+3.03%
2017	1,325	+0.95%
2023	1,443	+1.43%
Source: INSEE

Inhabitants of Pléguien are called pléguiénais in French.

== See also ==
- Communes of the Côtes-d'Armor department
