= Canton of Plouha =

Coordinates: 48.68°N 2.93°W

Plouha
- Canton
- Interactive map of Plouha
- Country: France
- Region: Brittany
- Department: Côtes-d'Armor
- No. of communes: {{{nbcomm}}}

Government
  - Representatives (2021–2028): Valérie Rumiano; Thierry Simelière
- Area: 187.76 km^{2} (72.49 sq mi)
- Population (2023): 27,491
  - Density: 146.42/km^{2} (379.21/sq mi)
- INSEE code: 22 22

The canton of Plouha is an administrative division of the Côtes-d'Armor department, northwestern France. Its borders were modified at the French canton reorganisation which came into effect in March 2015. Its seat is in Plouha.

== Composition ==
It consists of the following communes:

1. Binic-Étables-sur-Mer
2. Le Faouët
3. Gommenec'h
4. Lannebert
5. Lantic
6. Lanvollon
7. Pléguien
8. Plouha
9. Plourhan
10. Pludual
11. Saint-Gilles-les-Bois
12. Saint-Quay-Portrieux
13. Tréguidel
14. Tréméven
15. Tressignaux
16. Tréveneuc
17. Trévérec

== Councillors ==
Election	Councillors	Party	Occupation
2015	Valérie Rumiano	LR	Councillor of Plouha
2015	Thierry Simelière	UDI	Mayor of Saint-Quay-Portrieux

== Pictures of the canton ==
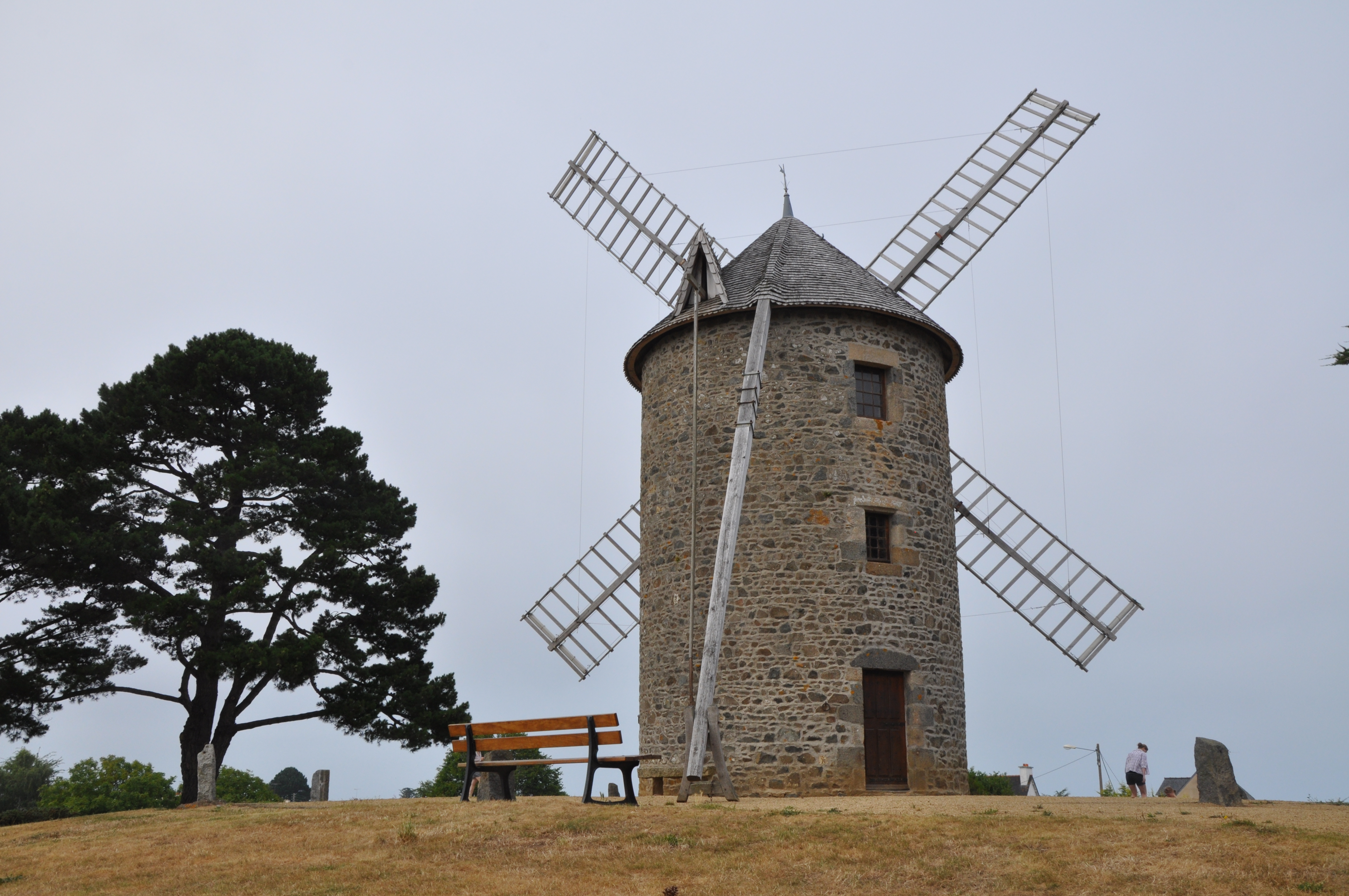
Windmill of Saint-Quay-Portrieux

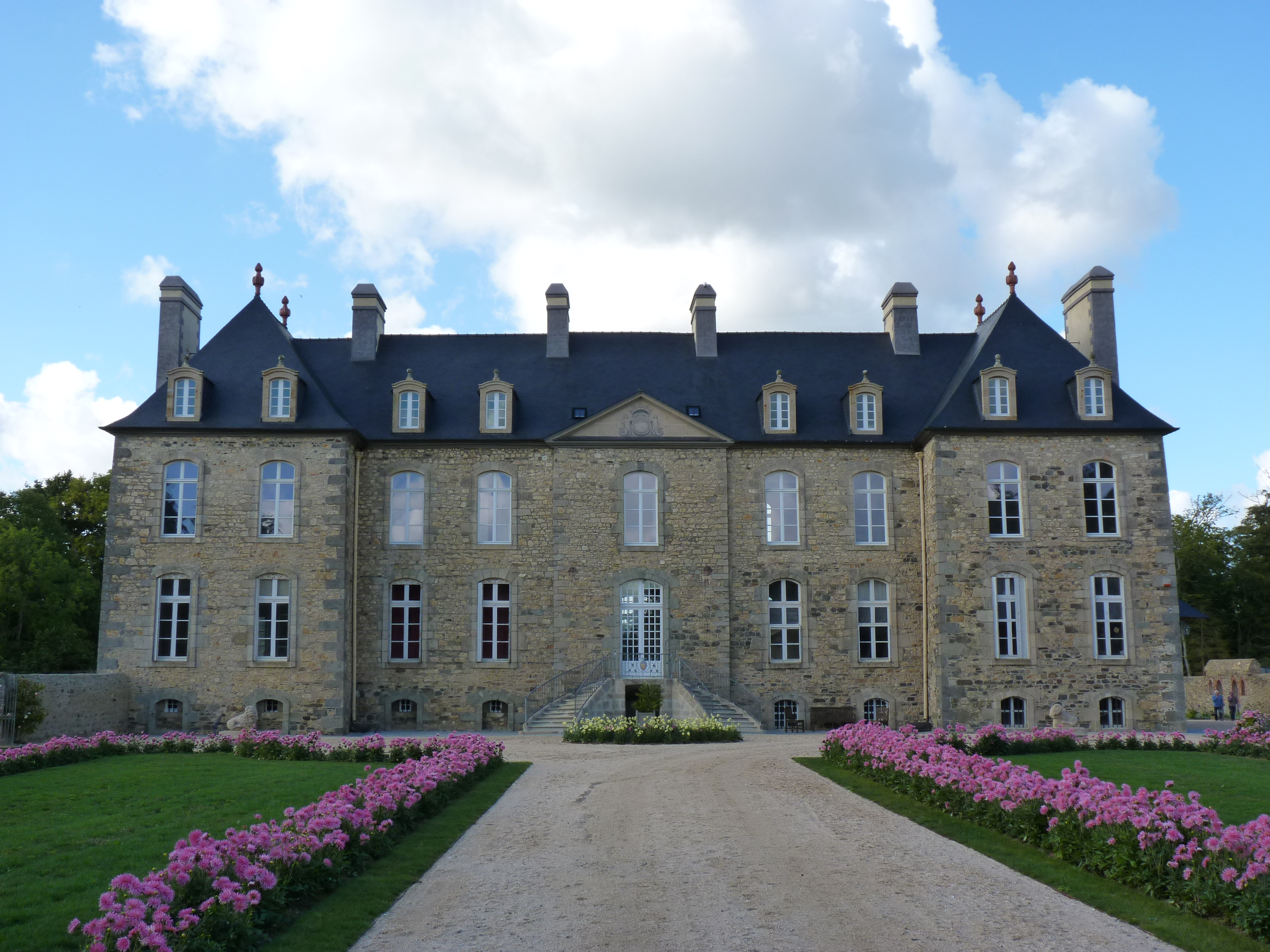
Castle of the Bois de la Salle in Pléguien

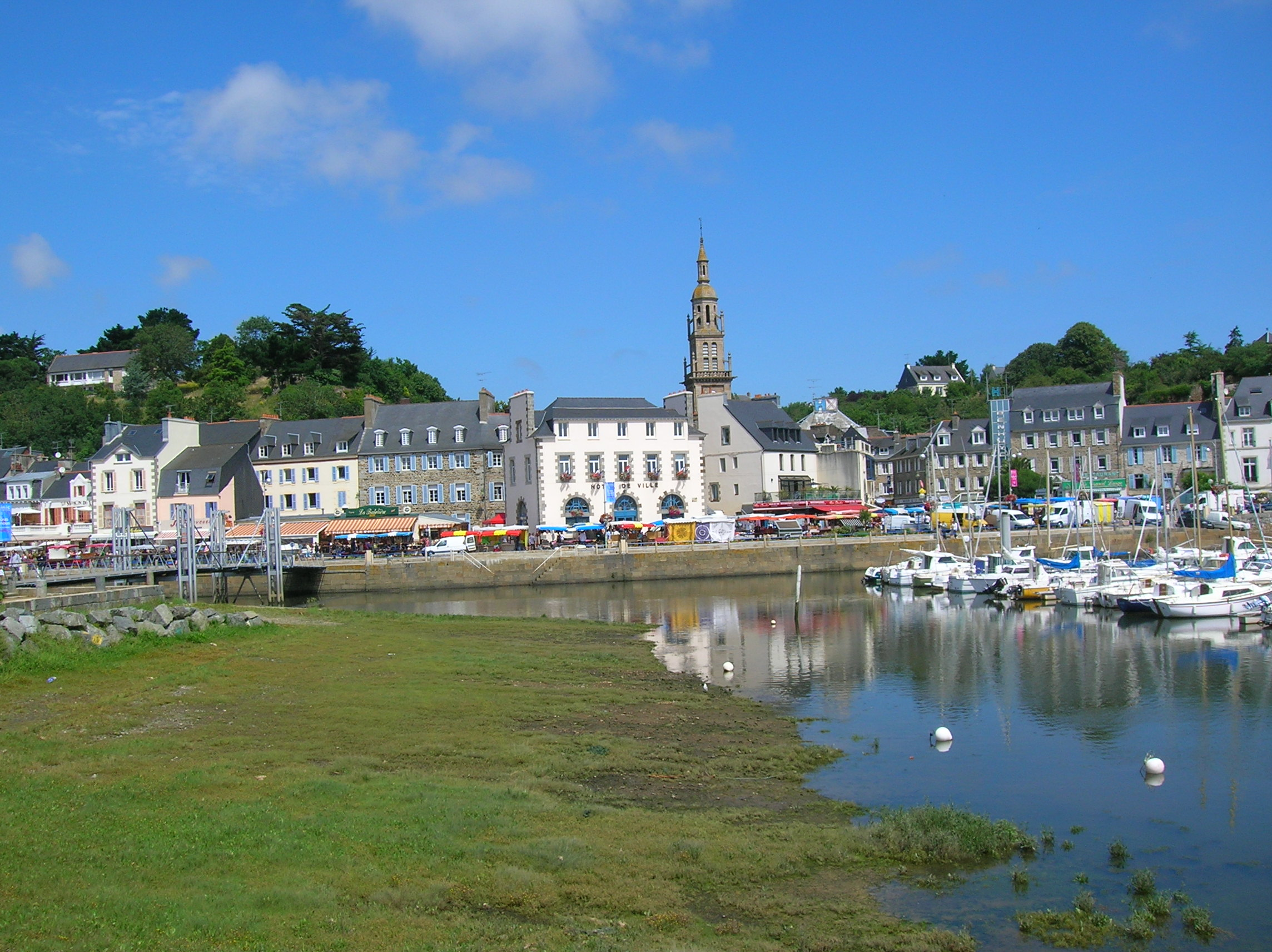
Port of Binic-Étables-sur-Mer
