= Austria at the 2012 Summer Olympics =

- IOC code: AUT
- NOC: Austrian Olympic Committee
- Website: www.olympia.at (in German)

in London
- Competitors: 70 in 17 sports
- Flag bearers: Markus Rogan (opening); Beate Schrott (closing)
- Medals: Gold 0 Silver 0 Bronze 0 Total 0

Summer Olympics appearances (overview)
- 1896; 1900; ~~1904~~; 1908; 1912; 1920; 1924; 1928; 1932; 1936; 1948; 1952; 1956; 1960; 1964; 1968; 1972; 1976; 1980; 1984; 1988; 1992; 1996; 2000; 2004; 2008; 2012; 2016; 2020; 2024; 2028

Other related appearances
- 1906 Intercalated Games

Austria competed at the 2012 Summer Olympics in London, from 27 July to 12 August 2012. The nation has competed at every edition of Summer Olympic Games, except the 1920 Summer Olympics in Antwerp. The Österreichisches Olympisches Comité sent a total of 70 athletes to the Games, 39 men and 31 women, to compete in 17 sports. This was approximately the same size as the previous Games, with the difference of one male athlete, the addition of one female athlete and three sporting events participated in. There was only a single competitor in eventing, fencing, rhythmic gymnastics, modern pentathlon, and Greco-Roman wrestling.

The Austrian team included past Olympic medalists: judoka Ludwig Paischer, who won silver in Beijing, and swimmer Markus Rogan, who was the nation's flag bearer at the opening ceremony. Rifle shooter and multiple time world champion Thomas Farnik, at age 45, competed at his sixth Olympics and was the oldest and most experienced team member. Meanwhile, two Austrian athletes made their fifth Olympic appearance: table tennis player and former world champion Werner Schlager, and slalom kayaker Helmut Oblinger, the husband of former Olympic bronze medalist Violetta Oblinger-Peters.

Austria, however, failed to win a single medal for the first time since 1964, after a poor performance at these games. Hurdler Beate Schrott, butterfly swimmer Dinko Jukic, open skiff sailors Nico Delle Karth and Nikolaus Resch, sprint kayak pair Yvonne Schuring and Viktoria Schwarz, and modern pentathlete Thomas Daniel qualified successfully for the final rounds of their respective sports, but missed out of the medal standings.

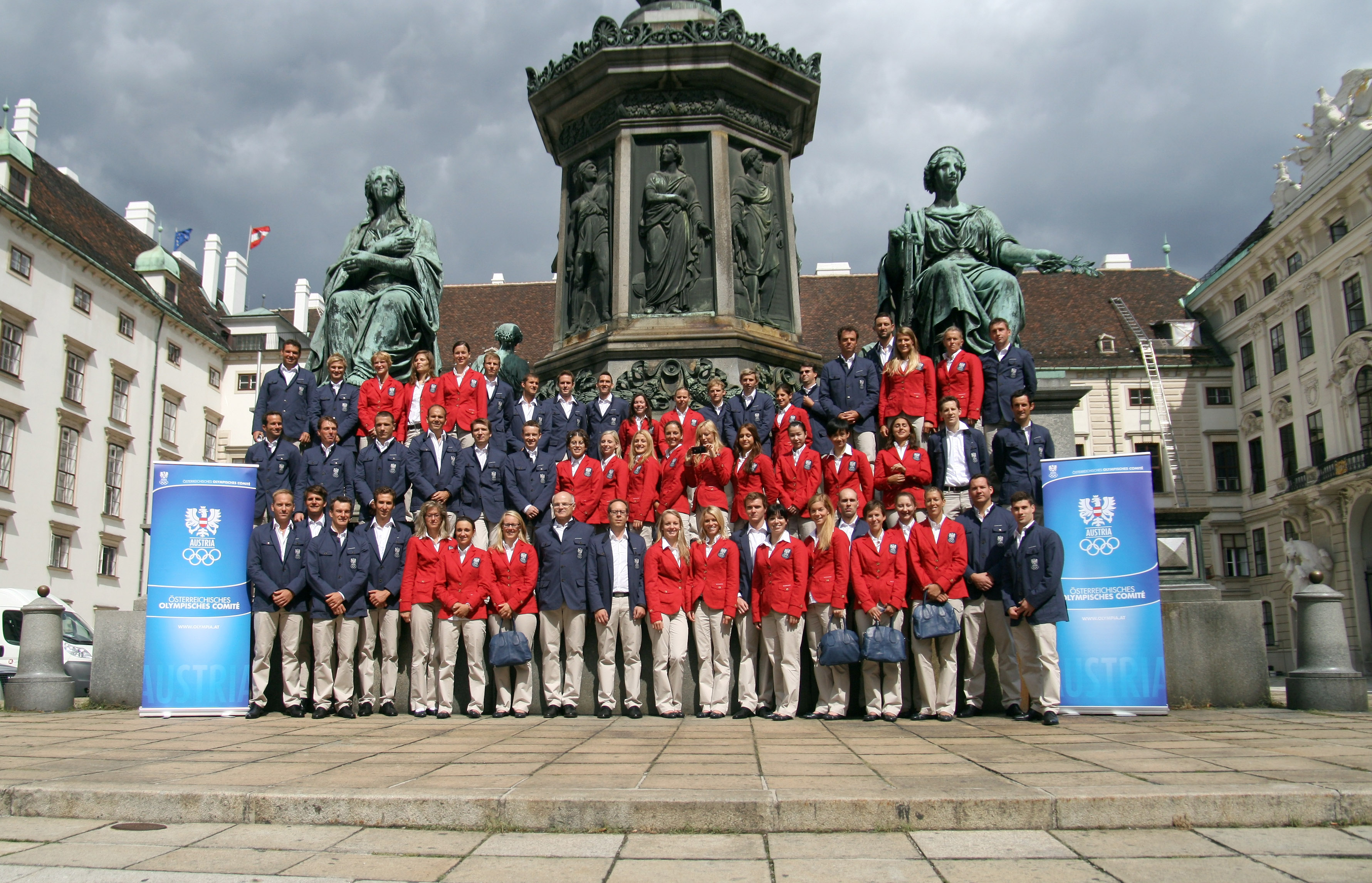
Austrian athletes for the 2012 Summer Olympics

== Athletics ==
Austrian athletes have further achieved qualifying standards in their respective events (up to a maximum of 3 athletes in each event at the 'A' Standard, and 1 at the 'B' Standard).

Key

- Note–Ranks given for track events are within the athlete's heat only
- Q = Qualified for the next round
- q = Qualified for the next round as a fastest loser or, in field events, by position without achieving the qualifying target
- NR = National record
- N/A = Round not applicable for the event
- Bye = Athlete not required to compete in round

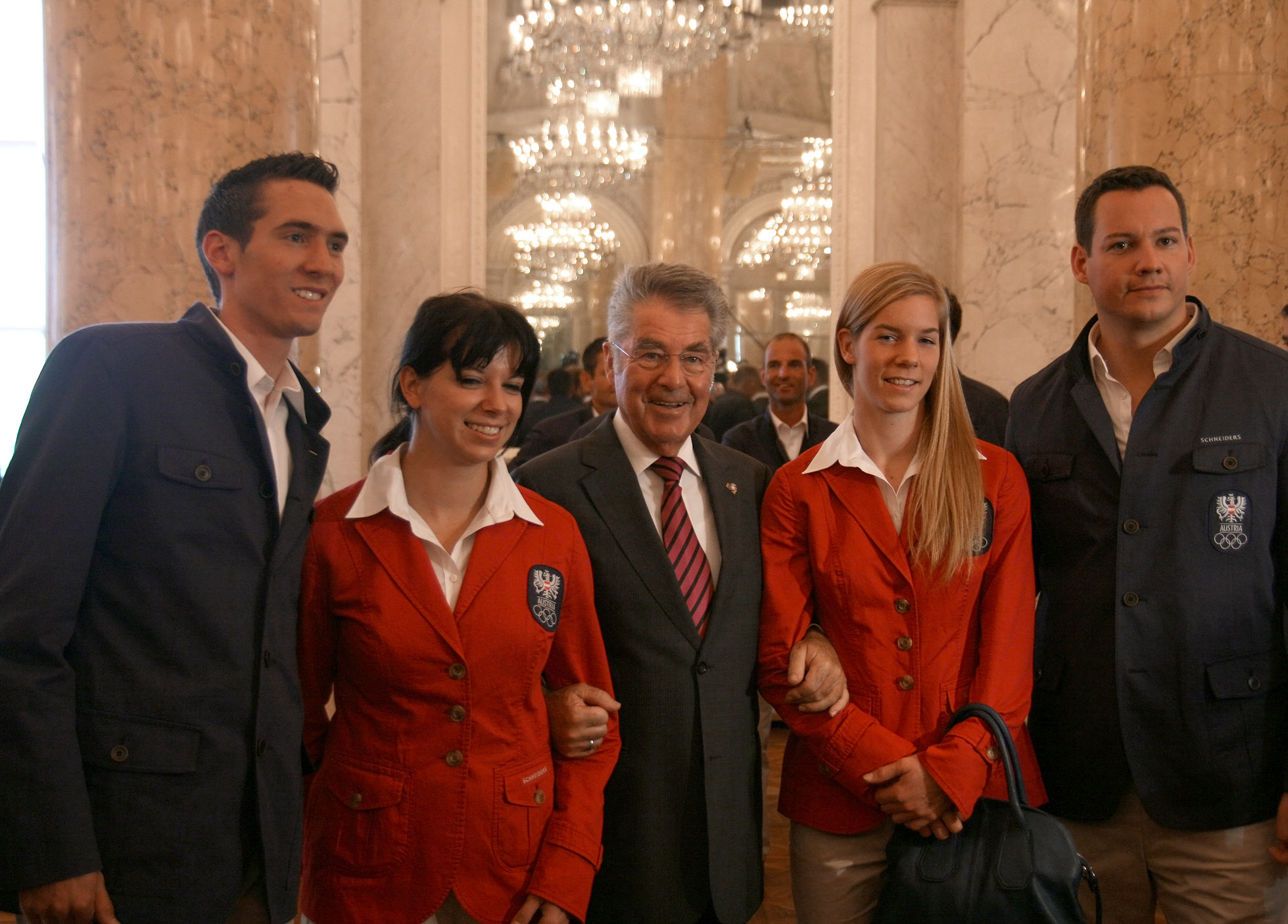
Austrian delegation in track and field. From L to R (Vojta, Eberl, Schrott, and Mayer)

Men
Track & road events

Athlete	Event	Heat		Semifinal		Final	
Athlete	Event	Result	Rank	Result	Rank	Result	Rank
Andreas Vojta	1500 m	3:43.52	12	Did not advance			
Günther Weidlinger	Marathon	—N/a				DNF	

Field events

Athlete	Event	Qualification		Final	
Athlete	Event	Distance	Position	Distance	Position
Gerhard Mayer	Discus throw	60.81	24	Did not advance	

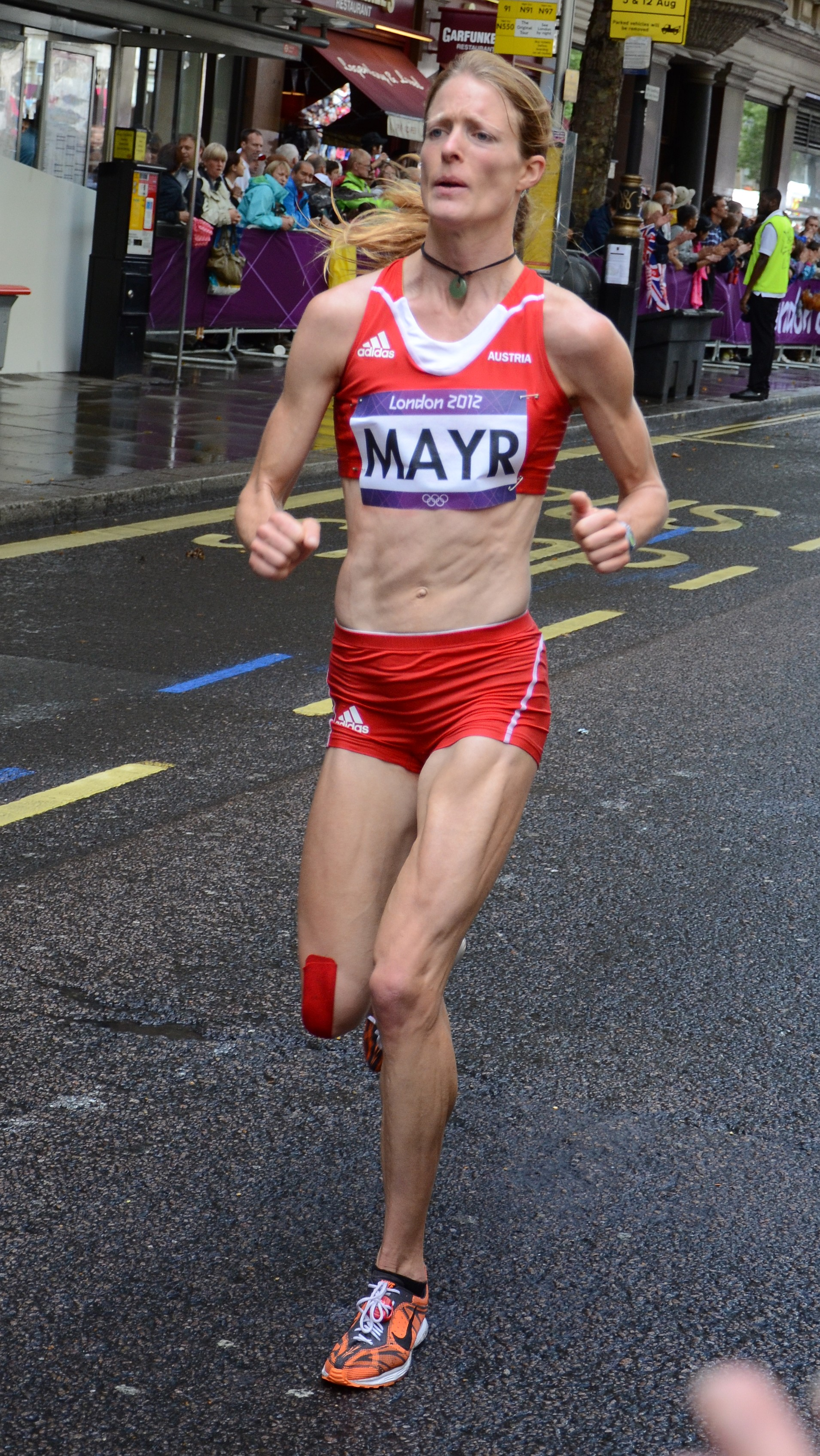
Andrea Mayr in women's marathon

Women
Track & road events

Athlete	Event	Heat		Semifinal		Final	
Athlete	Event	Result	Rank	Result	Rank	Result	Rank
Andrea Mayr	Marathon	—N/a				2:34:51	54
Beate Schrott	100 m hurdles	13.09	1 Q	12.83	2 Q	13.07	8

Field events

Athlete	Event	Qualification		Final	
Athlete	Event	Distance	Position	Distance	Position
Elisabeth Eberl	Javelin throw	49.66	37	Did not advance	

Combined events – Heptathlon

Athlete	Event	100H	HJ	SP	200 m	LJ	JT	800 m	Final	Rank
Ivona Dadic	Result	14.58	1.80	12.19	24.29	6.00	41.82	2:15.90	5935	25
Ivona Dadic	Points	898	978	674	953	850	702	880	5935	25

== Badminton ==
Athlete	Event	Group stage			Elimination	Quarterfinal	Semifinal	Final / BM	
Athlete	Event	Opposition Score	Opposition Score	Rank	Opposition Score	Opposition Score	Opposition Score	Opposition Score	Rank
Michael Lahnsteiner	Men's singles	Santoso (INA); L 11–21, 7–21	Must (EST); L 14–21, 18–21	3	Did not advance				
Simone Prutsch	Women's singles	Cheng S-c (TPE); L 11–21, 9–21	Yiğit (TUR); L 18–21, 10–21	3	Did not advance				

== Canoeing ==
=== Slalom ===
Austria has qualified boats for the following events

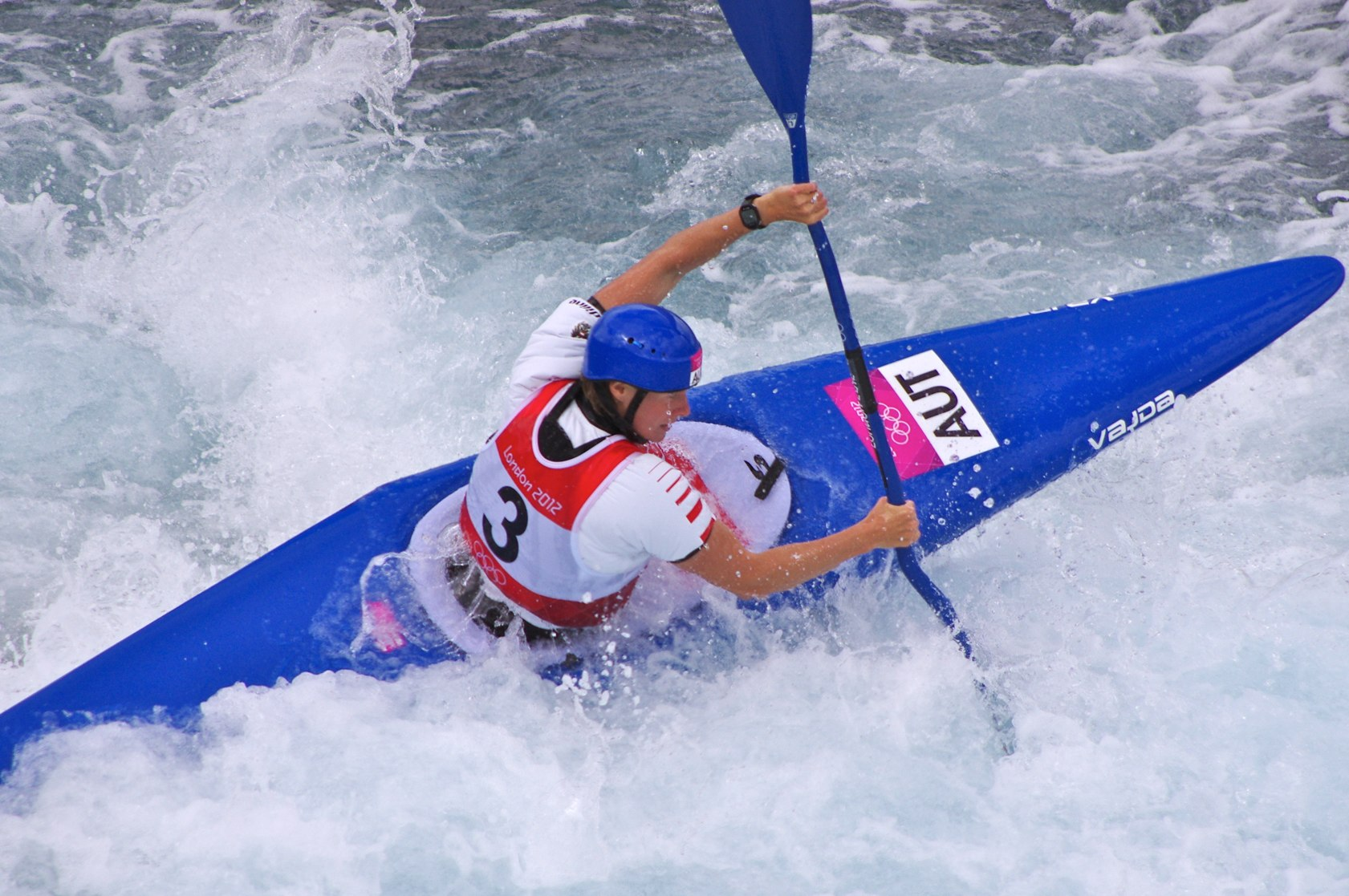
Corinna Kuhnle in the K-1 semifinal

Athlete	Event	Preliminary						Semifinal		Final	
Athlete	Event	Run 1	Rank	Run 2	Rank	Best	Rank	Time	Rank	Time	Rank
Helmut Oblinger	Men's K-1	88.81	5	92.66	14	88.81	10 Q	98.99	7 Q	104.28	8
Corinna Kuhnle	Women's K-1	160.06	16	101.77	5	101.77	7 Q	111.07	5 Q	119.30	8

=== Sprint ===
Austria has so far qualified boats for the following events

Athlete	Event	Heats		Semifinals		Finals	
Athlete	Event	Time	Rank	Time	Rank	Time	Rank
Yvonne Schuring; Viktoria Schwarz	Women's K-2 500 m	1:46.374	4 Q	1:42.317	2 FA	1:44.785	5

Qualification Legend: FA = Qualify to final (medal); FB = Qualify to final B (non-medal)

== Cycling ==
=== Road ===
Austria has qualified two riders.

Athlete	Event	Time	Rank
Bernhard Eisel	Men's road race	5:46:37	36
Daniel Schorn	Men's road race	5:46:37	81

=== Mountain biking ===
Athlete	Event	Time	Rank
Alexander Gehbauer	Men's cross-country	1:31:16	9
Karl Markt	Men's cross-country	1:33:18	20
Elisabeth Osl	Women's cross-country	1:36:47	15

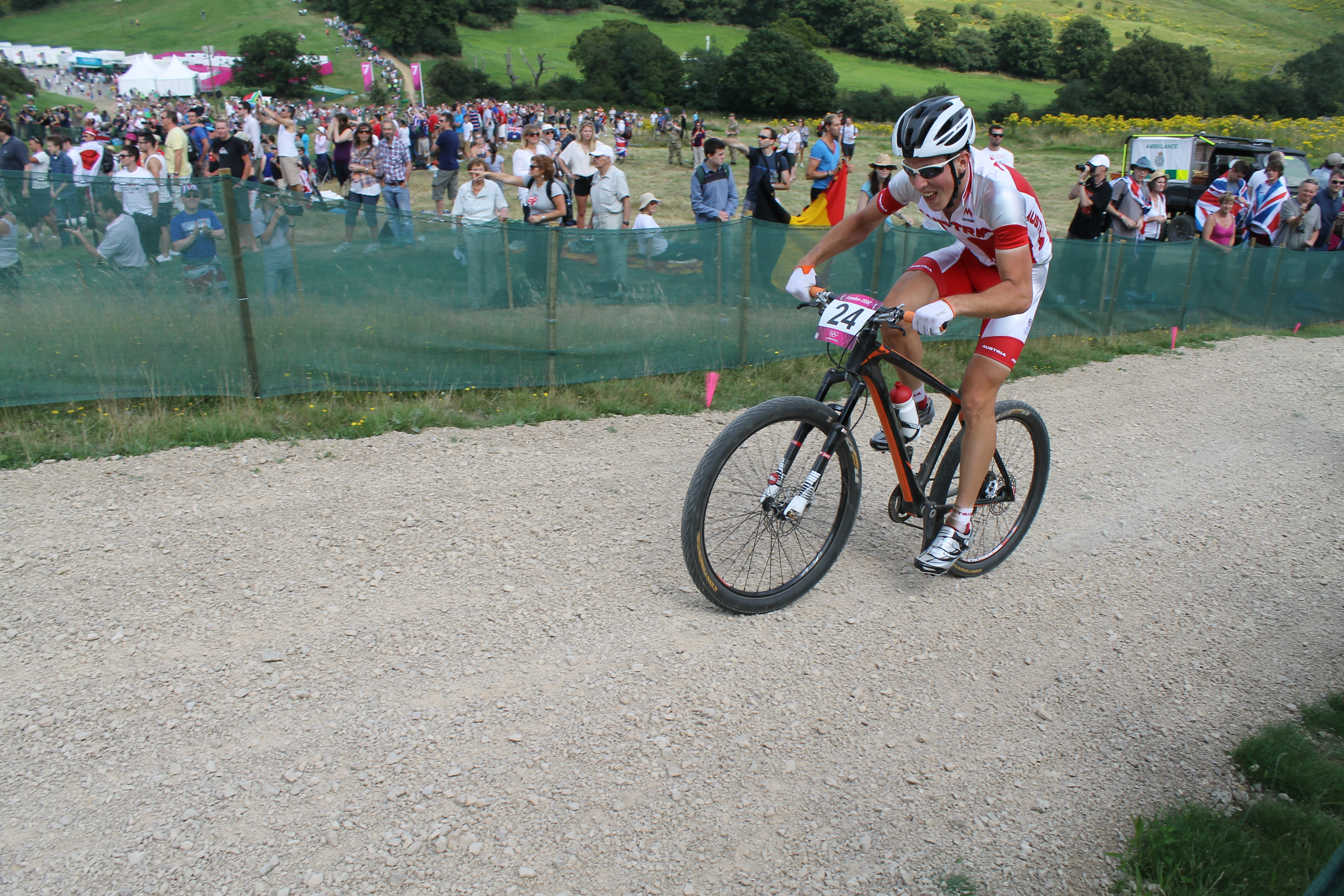
Alexander Gehbauer in the men's cross-country race

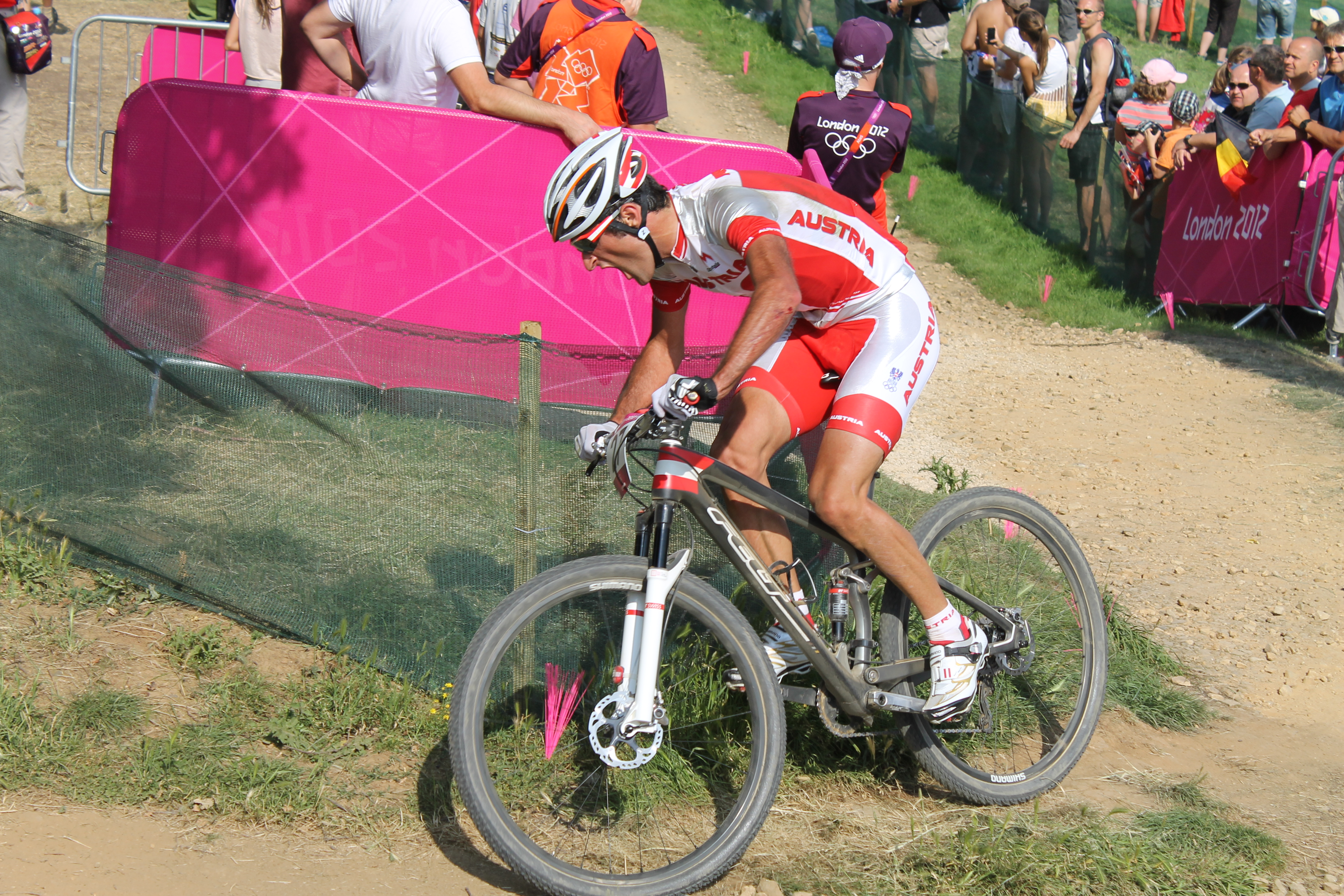
Karl Markt in the men's cross-country race

== Equestrian ==
=== Dressage ===
Athlete	Horse	Event	Grand Prix		Grand Prix Special		Grand Prix Freestyle		Overall	
Athlete	Horse	Event	Score	Rank	Score	Rank	Technical	Artistic	Score	Rank
Victoria Max-Theurer	Augustin	Individual	73.267	17 Q	73.619	17 Q	76.393	81.714	79.053	13
Renate Voglsang	Fabriano	Individual	69.635	34	Did not advance					

=== Eventing ===
Athlete	Horse	Event	Dressage		Cross-country			Jumping						Total	
Athlete	Horse	Event	Dressage		Cross-country			Qualifier			Final			Total	
Athlete	Horse	Event	Penalties	Rank	Penalties	Total	Rank	Penalties	Total	Rank	Penalties	Total	Rank	Penalties	Rank
Harald Ambros	O-Feltiz	Individual	69.50	71	Eliminated			Did not advance							

== Fencing ==
Austria has qualified 1 fencer.

Men

Athlete	Event	Round of 64	Round of 32	Round of 16	Quarterfinal	Semifinal	Final / BM	
Athlete	Event	Opposition Score	Opposition Score	Opposition Score	Opposition Score	Opposition Score	Opposition Score	Rank
Roland Schlosser	Individual foil	Bye	Lei S (CHN); L 9–15	Did not advance				

== Gymnastics ==
=== Artistic ===
Men

Athlete	Event	Qualification								Final							
Athlete	Event	Apparatus						Total	Rank	Apparatus						Total	Rank
Athlete	Event	F	PH	R	V	PB	HB	Total	Rank	F	PH	R	V	PB	HB	Total	Rank
Fabian Leimlehner	All-around	12.966	12.100	13.633	14.966	14.200	13.533	81.398	39	Did not advance							

Women

Athlete	Event	Qualification						Final					
Athlete	Event	Apparatus				Total	Rank	Apparatus				Total	Rank
Athlete	Event	F	V	UB	BB	Total	Rank	F	V	UB	BB	Total	Rank
Barbara Gasser	All-around	12.133	13.700	12.800	12.000	50.633	46	Did not advance					

=== Rhythmic ===
Athlete	Event	Qualification						Final					
Athlete	Event	Hoop	Ball	Clubs	Ribbon	Total	Rank	Hoop	Ball	Clubs	Ribbon	Total	Rank
Caroline Weber	Individual	25.950	25.925	26.725	26.350	104.950	18	Did not advance					

== Judo ==
Athlete	Event	Round of 64	Round of 32	Round of 16	Quarterfinals	Semifinals	Repechage	Final / BM	
Athlete	Event	Opposition Result	Opposition Result	Opposition Result	Opposition Result	Opposition Result	Opposition Result	Opposition Result	Rank
Ludwig Paischer	Men's −60 kg	Gnahoui (BEN); W 0100–0000	Sobirov (UZB); L 0210–0000	Did not advance					
Sabrina Filzmoser	Women's −57 kg	—N/a	Melançon (CAN); W 0100–0010	Diédhiou (SEN); W 1001–0001	Pavia (FRA); L 0002–0031	Did not advance	Quintavalle (ITA); L 0001–0100	Did not advance	7
Hilde Drexler	Women's −63 kg	—N/a	Zouak (MAR); W 0011–0000	Schlesinger (ISR); L 0001–0002	Did not advance				

== Modern pentathlon ==
Austria has qualified 1 athlete.

Athlete	Event	Fencing (épée one touch)			Swimming (200 m freestyle)			Riding (show jumping)			Combined: shooting/running (10 m air pistol)/(3000 m)			Total points	Final rank
Athlete	Event	Results	Rank	MP points	Time	Rank	MP points	Penalties	Rank	MP points	Time	Rank	MP points	Total points	Final rank
Thomas Daniel	Men's	17–18	=13	808	2:09.23	25	1252	20	5	1180	10:24.02	3	2504	5744	6

== Sailing ==
Austria has qualified 1 boat for each of the following events

Men

Athlete	Event	Race											Net points	Final rank
Athlete	Event	1	2	3	4	5	6	7	8	9	10	M*	Net points	Final rank
Andreas Geritzer	Laser	6	20	22	16	6	~~28~~	23	22	32	16	EL	158	20
Florian Raudaschl	Finn	6	19	23	24	~~25~~	15	21	24	24	23	EL	179	23
Florian Reichstädter; Matthias Schmid	470	1	4	7	19	4	16	~~24~~	10	14	14	18	107	9

Women

Athlete	Event	Race											Net points	Final rank
Athlete	Event	1	2	3	4	5	6	7	8	9	10	M*	Net points	Final rank
Eva-Maria Schimak; Lara Vadlau	470	~~20~~	15	15	16	18	13	20	18	10	19	EL	143	20

Open

Athlete	Event	Race																Net points	Final rank
Athlete	Event	1	2	3	4	5	6	7	8	9	10	11	12	13	14	15	M*	Net points	Final rank
Nico Delle-Karth; Nikolaus Resch	49er	10	15	6	5	5	16	4	~~19~~	4	9	6	17	11	4	4	2	118	4

M = Medal race; EL = Eliminated – did not advance into the medal race

== Shooting ==
Austria has ensured four quota places in the shooting events at the Games.

Men

Athlete	Event	Qualification		Final	
Athlete	Event	Points	Rank	Points	Rank
Thomas Farnik	50 m rifle 3 positions	1167	12	Did not advance	
Thomas Farnik	50 m rifle prone	592	27	Did not advance	
Thomas Farnik	10 m air rifle	591	28	Did not advance	
Christian Planer	50 m rifle prone	592	23	Did not advance	
Andreas Scherhaufer	Trap	119	17	Did not advance	

Women

Athlete	Event	Qualification		Final	
Athlete	Event	Points	Rank	Points	Rank
Stephanie Obermoser	50 m rifle 3 positions	573	37	Did not advance	
Stephanie Obermoser	10 m air rifle	395	19	Did not advance	

== Swimming ==
Austria selected 11 swimmers to the team after achieving qualifying standards in their respective events (up to a maximum of 2 swimmers in each event at the Olympic Qualifying Time (OQT), and 1 at the Olympic Selection Time (OST)): Three of their swimmers had competed at their first Games, including medley swimmer Lisa Zaiser, who was also the nation's youngest athlete.

The Austrian swimmers also included the former backstroker and Olympic silver medalist Markus Rogan, competing in the men's 200 m individual medley event, and Dinko Jukic, brother of former Olympic swimmer Mirna Jukic, in the butterfly events. By results, Jukic qualified successfully for the finals in the men's 200 m butterfly event, but missed out of the medal standings. Rogan, another Olympic hopeful, was disqualified in the semi-finals due to a technical mistake during a turn.

Men

Athlete	Event	Heat		Semifinal		Final	
Athlete	Event	Time	Rank	Time	Rank	Time	Rank
David Brandl	200 m freestyle	1:49.00	27	Did not advance			
Dinko Jukic	100 m butterfly	52.22	=13 Q	51.99	9	Did not advance	
Dinko Jukic	200 m butterfly	1:54.79	1 Q	1:54.95	6 Q	1:54.35	4
Hunor Mate	200 m breaststroke	2:15.98	29	Did not advance			
Markus Rogan	200 m individual medley	1:58.66	8 Q	DSQ		Did not advance	
Sebastian Stoss	200 m backstroke	2:02.91	34	Did not advance			
David Brandl; Florian Janistyn; Markus Rogan; Christian Scherübl	4 × 200 m freestyle relay	7:17.94	16	—N/a		Did not advance	

Women

Athlete	Event	Heat		Semifinal		Final	
Athlete	Event	Time	Rank	Time	Rank	Time	Rank
Nina Dittrich	800 m freestyle	8:45.41	28	—N/a		Did not advance	
Birgit Koschischek	100 m butterfly	1:00.54	37	Did not advance			
Jördis Steinegger	200 m freestyle	2:02.39	29	Did not advance			
Jördis Steinegger	400 m individual medley	4:45.80	23	—N/a		Did not advance	
Lisa Zaiser	200 m individual medley	2:14.56	19	Did not advance			

== Synchronized swimming ==
Austria has qualified 2 quota places in synchronized swimming.

Athlete	Event	Technical routine		Free routine (preliminary)			Free routine (final)		
Athlete	Event	Points	Rank	Points	Total (technical + free)	Rank	Points	Total (technical + free)	Rank
Nadine Brandl; Livia Lang	Duet	82.000	19	81.850	163.850	19	Did not advance		

== Table tennis ==
Austria has qualified three athletes for singles table tennis events. Based on their world rankings as of 16 May 2011 Werner Schlager and Weixing Chen have qualified for the men's event; Jia Liu has qualified for the women's.

Men

Athlete	Event	Preliminary round	Round 1	Round 2	Round 3	Round 4	Quarterfinals	Semifinals	Final / BM	
Athlete	Event	Opposition Result	Opposition Result	Opposition Result	Opposition Result	Opposition Result	Opposition Result	Opposition Result	Opposition Result	Rank
Weixing Chen	Singles	Bye		Didukh (UKR); W 4–0	Mattenet (FRA); W 4–0	Ovtcharov (GER); L 0–4	Did not advance			
Werner Schlager	Singles	Bye		Bobocica (ITA); W 4–2	Wang H (CHN); L 1–4	Did not advance				
Weixing Chen; Robert Gardos; Werner Schlager	Team	—N/a				Egypt; W 3–0	Germany; L 0–3	Did not advance		

Women

Athlete	Event	Preliminary round	Round 1	Round 2	Round 3	Round 4	Quarterfinals	Semifinals	Final / BM	
Athlete	Event	Opposition Result	Opposition Result	Opposition Result	Opposition Result	Opposition Result	Opposition Result	Opposition Result	Opposition Result	Rank
Li Qiangbing	Singles	Bye		Zhang (CAN); W 4–0	Ishikawa (JPN); L 2–4	Did not advance				
Liu Jia	Singles	Bye		Privalova (BLR); W 4–2	Kim K-A (KOR); L 1–4	Did not advance				
Li Qiangbing; Liu Jia; Amelie Solja	Team	—N/a				Hong Kong; L 1–3	Did not advance			

== Tennis ==
Athlete	Event	Round of 64	Round of 32	Round of 16	Quarterfinals	Semifinals	Final / BM	
Athlete	Event	Opposition Score	Opposition Score	Opposition Score	Opposition Score	Opposition Score	Opposition Score	Rank
Jürgen Melzer	Men's singles	Čilić (CRO); L 6–7^{(5–7)}, 2–6	Did not advance					
Jürgen Melzer; Alexander Peya	Men's doubles	—N/a	A Murray / J Murray (GBR); W 5–7, 7–6^{(8–6)}, 7–5	Ferrer / López (ESP); L 3–6, 6–3, 9–11	Did not advance			
Tamira Paszek	Women's singles	Cornet (FRA); L 6–7^{(4–7)}, 4–6	Did not advance					

== Triathlon ==
Austria has qualified the following athletes.

Athlete	Event	Swim (1.5 km)	Trans 1	Bike (40 km)	Trans 2	Run (10 km)	Total time	Rank
Andreas Giglmayr	Men's	18:57	0:43	58:45	0:28	32:21	1:51:14	40
Lisa Perterer	Women's	20:17	0:45	1:10:12	0:35	37:23	2:09:12	48

== Volleyball ==
=== Beach ===
Athlete	Event	Preliminary round	Standing	Round of 16	Quarterfinals	Semifinals	Final / BM	
Athlete	Event	Opposition Score	Standing	Opposition Score	Opposition Score	Opposition Score	Opposition Score	Rank
Clemens Doppler; Alexander Horst	Men's	Pool A Alison – Emanuel (BRA); L 1 – 2 (21–19, 17–21, 14–16); Lupo – Nicolai (ITA); W 2 – 0 (21–18, 21–17); Bellaguarda – Heuscher (SUI); L 0 – 2 (22–24, 12–21)	4	Did not advance				19
Doris Schwaiger; Stefanie Schwaiger	Women's	Pool C Kolocová – Sluková (CZE); L 1 – 2 (21–10, 13–21, 13–15); Cook – Hinchley (AUS); W 2 – 1 (18–21, 22–20, 15–10); May-Treanor – Walsh Jennings (USA); L 1 – 2 (21–17, 8–21, 10–15); Lucky Losers; Dampney – Mullin (GBR); W 2 – 0 (21–15, 21–12)	3 Q	Vasina – Vozakova (RUS); W 2 – 1 (21–17, 16–21, 15–9)	Xue – Zhang (CHN); L 0 – 2 (18–21, 11–21)	Did not advance		5

== Wrestling ==
Austria has qualified in the following events.

Key:

- VT – Victory by fall.
- PP – Decision by points – the loser with technical points.
- PO – Decision by points – the loser without technical points.

Men's Greco-Roman

Athlete	Event	Qualification	Round of 16	Quarterfinal	Semifinal	Repechage 1	Repechage 2	Final / BM	
Athlete	Event	Opposition Result	Opposition Result	Opposition Result	Opposition Result	Opposition Result	Opposition Result	Opposition Result	Rank
Amer Hrustanović	−84 kg	Lee S-Y (KOR); W 3–0 ^{PO}	Janikowski (POL); L 0–3 ^{PO}	Did not advance					10
