= Beach volleyball at the 2012 Summer Olympics – Women's tournament =

Women's beach volleyball at the Games of the XXX Olympiad
- Venue: Horse Guards Parade
- Dates: 28 July – 8 August
- Competitors: 48 from 19 nations

Medalists
1st place, gold medalist(s)		Misty May-Treanor; Kerri Walsh Jennings	United States
2nd place, silver medalist(s)		Jennifer Kessy; April Ross	United States
3rd place, bronze medalist(s)		Juliana Felisberta; Larissa França	Brazil

The women's beach volleyball tournament at the 2012 Olympic Games in London, United Kingdom, took place between July 28, 2012 and August 8, 2012 at Horse Guards Parade.

Twenty-four pairs of competitors were taking part, including one from Great Britain as the host country, and a maximum of two from each other nation. Sixteen qualified through positioning in the FIVB Beach Volleyball World Rankings as of 17 June 2012, five others earned their places at the 2010–12 Continental Beach Volleyball Cup, and the final three from the FIVB Beach Volleyball World Cup Olympic Qualification tournament.

By virtue of the two American pairings winning gold and silver, this marked the second time in Olympic history the top two women's teams were both from the same country, the first being Brazil back in 1996 when the event debuted.

== Qualification ==
Means of qualification	Vacancies	Qualified
FIVB Beach Volleyball Olympic Ranking (as of 17 June 2012)	16	Brazil; China; United States; Brazil; United States; Netherlands; Italy; Germany; Czech Republic; Spain; Germany; Switzerland; Austria; Australia; Czech Republic; Greece
2010–12 Continental Beach Volleyball Cup (confirmed on 2 July 2012)	5	Mauritius (Africa); Argentina (South America); Russia (Europe); Canada (North America); Australia (Asia/Oceania)
Beach Volleyball World Cup Final Olympic Qualification (26 June – 1 July 2012)	2	Netherlands; Russia
Host nation	1	Great Britain
Total	24	

== Seeds ==
Rank	Team	NOC
1	Juliana Felisberta – Larissa França	Brazil
2	Xue Chen – Zhang Xi	China
3	Misty May-Treanor – Kerri Walsh Jennings	United States
4	Jennifer Kessy – April Ross	United States
5	Maria Antonelli – Talita Antunes	Brazil
6	Zara Dampney – Shauna Mullin	Great Britain
7	Greta Cicolari – Marta Menegatti	Italy
8	Sara Goller – Laura Ludwig	Germany
9	Sanne Keizer – Marleen van Iersel	Netherlands
10	Kristýna Kolocová – Markéta Sluková	Czech Republic
11	Simone Kuhn – Nadine Zumkehr	Switzerland
12	Katrin Holtwick – Ilka Semmler	Germany
13	Lenka Háječková – Hana Klapalová	Czech Republic
14	Vassiliki Arvaniti – Maria Tsiartsiani	Greece
15	Doris Schwaiger – Stefanie Schwaiger	Austria
16	Elsa Baquerizo – Liliana Fernández	Spain
17	Louise Bawden – Becchara Palmer	Australia
18	Ekaterina Khomyakova – Evgenia Ukolova	Russia
19	Marie-Andrée Lessard – Annie Martin	Canada
20	Madelein Meppelink – Sophie van Gestel	Netherlands
21	Ana Gallay – María Zonta	Argentina
22	Natalie Cook – Tamsin Hinchley	Australia
23	Anastasia Vasina – Anna Vozakova	Russia
24	Natacha Rigobert – Elodie Li Yuk Lo	Mauritius

== Preliminary round ==
The composition of the preliminary rounds was announced confirmed on 19 July 2012 in a draw held in Klagenfurt, Austria.

Teams are awarded two points for a win and one for a loss. If two teams are tied at the end of pool play, the tiebreakers is their head-to-head match. If three or more teams are tied, the tiebreakers are (1) points ratio between tied teams, (2) points ratio within pool, and (3) tournament seed. The two best teams from each group advance to the round of 16. The two best third-placed teams also qualify. Two 'lucky loser' matches qualify two more of the third-placed teams.

- All times are British Summer Time (UTC+01:00).

=== Pool A ===
Pos	Team	Pld	W	L	Pts	SW	SL	SR	SPW	SPL	SPR	Qualification
1	Juliana – Larissa (BRA)	3	3	0	6	6	0	MAX	126	76	1.658	Round of 16
2	Holtwick – Semmler (GER)	3	2	1	5	4	2	2.000	115	97	1.186	Round of 16
3	Háječková – Klapalová (CZE)	3	1	2	4	2	4	0.500	106	105	1.010	Third place/'lucky loser' play-offs
4	Rigobert – Li Yuk Lo (MRI)	3	0	3	3	0	6	0.000	57	126	0.452	Eliminated

28 July 2012; 10:00	Holtwick – Semmler (GER)	2–0	Háječková – Klapalová (CZE)	Horse Guards Parade
28 July 2012; 10:00	(21–16, 21–18); Report			Horse Guards Parade

28 July 2012; 17:30	Juliana – Larissa (BRA)	2–0	Rigobert – Li Yuk Lo (MRI)	Horse Guards Parade
28 July 2012; 17:30	(21–5, 21–10); Report			Horse Guards Parade

30 July 2012; 09:00	Háječková – Klapalová (CZE)	2–0	Rigobert – Li Yuk Lo (MRI)	Horse Guards Parade
30 July 2012; 09:00	(21–10, 21–11); Report			Horse Guards Parade

30 July 2012; 15:30	Juliana – Larissa (BRA)	2–0	Holtwick – Semmler (GER)	Horse Guards Parade
30 July 2012; 15:30	(21–18, 21–13); Report			Horse Guards Parade

1 August 2012; 10:00	Holtwick – Semmler (GER)	2–0	Rigobert – Li Yuk Lo (MRI)	Horse Guards Parade
1 August 2012; 10:00	(21–11, 21–10); Report			Horse Guards Parade

1 August 2012; 15:30	Juliana – Larissa (BRA)	2–0	Háječková – Klapalová (CZE)	Horse Guards Parade
1 August 2012; 15:30	(21–12, 21–18); Report			Horse Guards Parade

=== Pool B ===
Pos	Team	Pld	W	L	Pts	SW	SL	SR	SPW	SPL	SPR	Qualification
1	Vasina – Vozakova (RUS)	3	2	1	5	5	4	1.250	156	150	1.040	Round of 16
2	Xue – Zhang (CHN)	3	2	1	5	5	3	1.667	143	135	1.059	Round of 16
3	Kuhn – Zumkehr (SUI)	3	1	2	4	4	4	1.000	136	139	0.978	Round of 16
4	Arvaniti – Tsiartsiani (GRE)	3	1	2	4	2	5	0.400	119	130	0.915	Eliminated

28 July 2012; 09:00	Xue – Zhang (CHN)	1–2	Vasina – Vozakova (RUS)	Horse Guards Parade
28 July 2012; 09:00	(21–18, 14–21, 14–16); Report			Horse Guards Parade

28 July 2012; 21:00	Kuhn – Zumkehr (SUI)	2–0	Arvaniti – Tsiartsiani (GRE)	Horse Guards Parade
28 July 2012; 21:00	(21–13, 21–19); Report			Horse Guards Parade

30 July 2012; 10:00	Xue – Zhang (CHN)	2–1	Kuhn – Zumkehr (SUI)	Horse Guards Parade
30 July 2012; 10:00	(21–18, 16–21, 15–8); Report			Horse Guards Parade

30 July 2012; 16:30	Arvaniti – Tsiartsiani (GRE)	2–1	Vasina – Vozakova (RUS)	Horse Guards Parade
30 July 2012; 16:30	(18–21, 21–13, 15–12); Report			Horse Guards Parade

1 August 2012; 09:00	Xue – Zhang (CHN)	2–0	Arvaniti – Tsiartsiani (GRE)	Horse Guards Parade
1 August 2012; 09:00	(21–17, 21–16); Report			Horse Guards Parade

1 August 2012; 14:30	Kuhn – Zumkehr (SUI)	1–2	Vasina – Vozakova (RUS)	Horse Guards Parade
1 August 2012; 14:30	(17–21, 21–19, 9–15); Report			Horse Guards Parade

=== Pool C ===
Pos	Team	Pld	W	L	Pts	SW	SL	SR	SPW	SPL	SPR	Qualification
1	May-Treanor – Walsh Jennings (USA)	3	3	0	6	6	1	6.000	137	109	1.257	Round of 16
2	Kolocová – Sluková (CZE)	3	2	1	5	4	4	1.000	133	137	0.971	Round of 16
3	Schwaiger – Schwaiger (AUT)	3	1	2	4	4	5	0.800	141	150	0.940	Third place/'lucky loser' play-offs
4	Cook – Hinchley (AUS)	3	0	3	3	2	6	0.333	136	151	0.901	Eliminated

28 July 2012; 14:30	Kolocová – Sluková (CZE)	2–1	Schwaiger – Schwaiger (AUT)	Horse Guards Parade
28 July 2012; 14:30	(10–21, 21–13, 15–13); Report			Horse Guards Parade

28 July 2012; 23:00	May-Treanor – Walsh Jennings (USA)	2–0	Cook – Hinchley (AUS)	Horse Guards Parade
28 July 2012; 23:00	(21–18, 21–19); Report			Horse Guards Parade

30 July 2012; 22:00	Schwaiger – Schwaiger (AUT)	2–1	Cook – Hinchley (AUS)	Horse Guards Parade
30 July 2012; 22:00	(18–21, 22–20, 15–10); Report			Horse Guards Parade

30 July 2012; 23:00	May-Treanor – Walsh Jennings (USA)	2–0	Kolocová – Sluková (CZE)	Horse Guards Parade
30 July 2012; 23:00	(21–14, 21–19); Report			Horse Guards Parade

1 August 2012; 22:00	Kolocová – Sluková (CZE)	2–1	Cook – Hinchley (AUS)	Horse Guards Parade
1 August 2012; 22:00	(21–16, 18–21, 15–11); Report			Horse Guards Parade

1 August 2012; 23:00	May-Treanor – Walsh Jennings (USA)	2–1	Schwaiger – Schwaiger (AUT)	Horse Guards Parade
1 August 2012; 23:00	(17–21, 21–8, 15–10); Report			Horse Guards Parade

=== Pool D ===
Pos	Team	Pld	W	L	Pts	SW	SL	SR	SPW	SPL	SPR	Qualification
1	Kessy – Ross (USA)	3	3	0	6	6	2	3.000	149	130	1.146	Round of 16
2	Baquerizo – Fernández (ESP)	3	2	1	5	5	3	1.667	150	143	1.049	Round of 16
3	Keizer – van Iersel (NED)	3	1	2	4	4	4	1.000	134	126	1.063	Round of 16
4	Gallay – Zonta (ARG)	3	0	3	3	0	6	0.000	93	127	0.732	Eliminated

29 July 2012; 12:00	Keizer – van Iersel (NED)	1–2	Baquerizo – Fernández (ESP)	Horse Guards Parade; Referees: Miguel Rivera Ramirez (MEX), Wang Leijun (CHN)
29 July 2012; 12:00	(21–14, 16–21, 11–15); Report			Horse Guards Parade; Referees: Miguel Rivera Ramirez (MEX), Wang Leijun (CHN)

29 July 2012; 21:00	Kessy – Ross (USA)	2–0	Gallay – Zonta (ARG)	Horse Guards Parade; Referees: Wang Leijun (CHN), Catriona Tweedie (AUS)
29 July 2012; 21:00	(21–11, 21–18); Report			Horse Guards Parade; Referees: Wang Leijun (CHN), Catriona Tweedie (AUS)

31 July 2012; 11:00	Baquerizo – Fernández (ESP)	2–0	Gallay – Zonta (ARG)	Horse Guards Parade; Referees: Miguel Rivera Ramirez (MEX), Marc Berard (FRA)
31 July 2012; 11:00	(22–20, 21–16); Report			Horse Guards Parade; Referees: Miguel Rivera Ramirez (MEX), Marc Berard (FRA)

31 July 2012; 23:00	Kessy – Ross (USA)	2–1	Keizer – van Iersel (NED)	Horse Guards Parade; Referees: Jonas Personeni (SUI), Wang Leijun (CHN)
31 July 2012; 23:00	(21–15, 12–21, 15–8); Report			Horse Guards Parade; Referees: Jonas Personeni (SUI), Wang Leijun (CHN)

2 August 2012; 11:00	Keizer – van Iersel (NED)	2–0	Gallay – Zonta (ARG)	Horse Guards Parade
2 August 2012; 11:00	(21–12, 21–16); Report			Horse Guards Parade

2 August 2012; 16:30	Kessy – Ross (USA)	2–1	Baquerizo – Fernández (ESP)	Horse Guards Parade; Referees: Richard Casutt (NZL), Wang Leijun (CHN)
2 August 2012; 16:30	(21–19, 19–21, 19–17); Report			Horse Guards Parade; Referees: Richard Casutt (NZL), Wang Leijun (CHN)

=== Pool E ===
Pos	Team	Pld	W	L	Pts	SW	SL	SR	SPW	SPL	SPR	Qualification
1	Maria – Talita (BRA)	3	3	0	6	6	2	3.000	161	138	1.167	Round of 16
2	Goller – Ludwig (GER)	3	2	1	5	5	3	1.667	160	144	1.111	Round of 16
3	Meppelink – van Gestel (NED)	3	1	2	4	2	4	0.500	103	118	0.873	Third place/'lucky loser' play-offs
4	Bawden – Palmer (AUS)	3	0	3	3	2	6	0.333	127	151	0.841	Eliminated

29 July 2012; 16:30	Goller – Ludwig (GER)	2–1	Bawden – Palmer (AUS)	Horse Guards Parade
29 July 2012; 16:30	(21–18, 19–21, 15–8); Report			Horse Guards Parade

29 July 2012; 20:00	Maria – Talita (BRA)	2–0	Meppelink – van Gestel (NED)	Horse Guards Parade
29 July 2012; 20:00	(21–10, 21–19); Report			Horse Guards Parade

31 July 2012; 12:00	Maria – Talita (BRA)	2–1	Goller – Ludwig (GER)	Horse Guards Parade
31 July 2012; 12:00	(21–19, 29–31, 15–13); Report			Horse Guards Parade

31 July 2012; 16:30	Bawden – Palmer (AUS)	0–2	Meppelink – van Gestel (NED)	Horse Guards Parade
31 July 2012; 16:30	(19–21, 15–21); Report			Horse Guards Parade

2 August 2012; 14:30	Goller – Ludwig (GER)	2–0	Meppelink – van Gestel (NED)	Horse Guards Parade
2 August 2012; 14:30	(21–18, 21–14); Report			Horse Guards Parade

2 August 2012; 17:30	Maria – Talita (BRA)	2–1	Bawden – Palmer (AUS)	Horse Guards Parade
2 August 2012; 17:30	(18–21, 21–16, 15–9); Report			Horse Guards Parade

=== Pool F ===
Pos	Team	Pld	W	L	Pts	SW	SL	SR	SPW	SPL	SPR	Qualification
1	Cicolari – Menegatti (ITA)	3	3	0	6	6	2	3.000	154	124	1.242	Round of 16
2	Khomyakova – Ukolova (RUS)	3	2	1	5	5	3	1.667	157	150	1.047	Round of 16
3	Dampney – Mullin (GBR)	3	1	2	4	2	5	0.400	119	136	0.875	Third place/'lucky loser' play-offs
4	Lessard – Martin (CAN)	3	0	3	3	3	6	0.500	156	176	0.886	Eliminated

29 July 2012; 09:00	Cicolari – Menegatti (ITA)	2–1	Khomyakova – Ukolova (RUS)	Horse Guards Parade
29 July 2012; 09:00	(17–21, 21–18, 15–8); Report			Horse Guards Parade

29 July 2012; 17:30	Dampney – Mullin (GBR)	2–1	Lessard – Martin (CAN)	Horse Guards Parade
29 July 2012; 17:30	(17–21, 21–14, 15–13); Report			Horse Guards Parade

31 July 2012; 17:30	Dampney – Mullin (GBR)	0–2	Cicolari – Menegatti (ITA)	Horse Guards Parade
31 July 2012; 17:30	(18–21, 12–21); Report			Horse Guards Parade

31 July 2012; 20:00	Khomyakova – Ukolova (RUS)	2–1	Lessard – Martin (CAN)	Horse Guards Parade
31 July 2012; 20:00	(21–18, 28–30, 15–13); Report			Horse Guards Parade

2 August 2012; 12:00	Cicolari – Menegatti (ITA)	2–1	Lessard – Martin (CAN)	Horse Guards Parade
2 August 2012; 12:00	(21–12, 23–25, 15–10); Report			Horse Guards Parade

2 August 2012; 15:30	Dampney – Mullin (GBR)	0–2	Khomyakova – Ukolova (RUS)	Horse Guards Parade
2 August 2012; 15:30	(23–25, 13–21); Report			Horse Guards Parade

=== Lucky loser ===
Of the six teams that are placed third in their pools, two directly qualify for the play-offs. From the four remaining third-placed teams, another two teams qualify for the play-offs by winning a 'lucky loser' match.

This table shows the results of the third placed teams after the pool play, and before the 'lucky loser' matches.

Pos	Team	Pld	W	L	Pts	SW	SL	SR	SPW	SPL	SPR	Qualification
1	Keizer – van Iersel (NED)	3	1	2	4	4	4	1.000	134	126	1.063	Round of 16
2	Kuhn – Zumkehr (SUI)	3	1	2	4	4	4	1.000	136	139	0.978	Round of 16
3	Schwaiger – Schwaiger (AUT)	3	1	2	4	4	5	0.800	141	150	0.940	Lucky loser play-offs
4	Háječková – Klapalová (CZE)	3	1	2	4	2	4	0.500	106	105	1.010	Lucky loser play-offs
5	Meppelink – van Gestel (NED)	3	1	2	4	2	4	0.500	103	118	0.873	Lucky loser play-offs
6	Dampney – Mullin (GBR)	3	1	2	4	2	5	0.400	119	136	0.875	Lucky loser play-offs

==== Lucky loser play-offs ====
2 August 2012; 22:00	Schwaiger – Schwaiger (AUT)	2–0	Dampney – Mullin (GBR)	Horse Guards Parade
2 August 2012; 22:00	(21–15, 21–12); Report			Horse Guards Parade

2 August 2012; 22:00	Háječková – Klapalová (CZE)	0–2	Meppelink – van Gestel (NED)	Horse Guards Parade
2 August 2012; 22:00	(17–21, 17–21); Report			Horse Guards Parade

== Playoffs ==
=== Bracket ===
Round of 16
1	Juliana – Larissa (BRA)	21	21
20	Meppelink – van Gestel (NED)	10	17
8	Goller – Ludwig (GER)	21	21
12	Holtwick – Semmler (GER)	16	15
5	Antonelli – Antunes (BRA)	16	22	9
10	Kolocová – Sluková (CZE)	21	20	15
11	Kuhn – Zumkehr (SUI)	15	19
4	Kessy – Ross (USA)	21	21
3	May-Treanor – Walsh Jennings (USA)	21	21
9	Keizer – van Iersel (NED)	15	12
16	Baquerizo – Fernández (ESP)	15	15
7	Cicolari – Menegatti (ITA)	21	21
15	Schwaiger – Schwaiger (AUT)	21	16	15
23	Vasina – Vozakova (RUS)	17	21	9
18	Khomyakova – Ukolova (RUS)	12	11
2	Xue – Zhang (CHN)	21	21

Quarter-finals
1	Juliana – Larissa (BRA)	21	21
8	Goller – Ludwig (GER)	10	19
10	Kolocová – Sluková (CZE)	23	18
4	Kessy – Ross (USA)	25	21
3	May-Treanor – Walsh Jennings (USA)	21	21
7	Cicolari – Menegatti (ITA)	13	13
15	Schwaiger – Schwaiger (AUT)	18	11
2	Xue – Zhang (CHN)	21	21

Semi-finals
1	Juliana – Larissa (BRA)	21	19	12
4	Kessy – Ross (USA)	15	21	15
3	May-Treanor – Walsh Jennings (USA)	22	22
2	Xue – Zhang (CHN)	20	20

Final
4	Kessy – Ross (USA)	16	16
3	May-Treanor – Walsh Jennings (USA)	21	21
Bronze medal match
1	Juliana – Larissa (BRA)	11	21	15
2	Xue – Zhang (CHN)	21	19	12

=== Round of 16 ===
3 August 2012; 09:00	Goller – Ludwig (GER)	2–0	Holtwick – Semmler (GER)	Horse Guards Parade; Referees: Amina Abdou Elsergany (EGY), Richard Casutt (NZL)
3 August 2012; 09:00	(21–16, 21–15); Report			Horse Guards Parade; Referees: Amina Abdou Elsergany (EGY), Richard Casutt (NZL)

3 August 2012; 14:00	Juliana – Larissa (BRA)	2–0	Meppelink – van Gestel (NED)	Horse Guards Parade; Referees: Wang Leijun (CHN), Jonas Personeni (SUI)
3 August 2012; 14:00	(21–10, 21–17); Report			Horse Guards Parade; Referees: Wang Leijun (CHN), Jonas Personeni (SUI)

3 August 2012; 17:00	Kuhn – Zumkehr (SUI)	0–2	Kessy – Ross (USA)	Horse Guards Parade; Referees: Damien Searle (GBR), Catriona Tweedie (AUS)
3 August 2012; 17:00	(15–21, 19–21); Report			Horse Guards Parade; Referees: Damien Searle (GBR), Catriona Tweedie (AUS)

3 August 2012; 22:00	Schwaiger – Schwaiger (AUT)	2–1	Vasina – Vozakova (RUS)	Horse Guards Parade
3 August 2012; 22:00	(21–17, 16–21, 15–9); Report			Horse Guards Parade

4 August 2012; 09:00	Khomyakova – Ukolova (RUS)	0–2	Xue – Zhang (CHN)	Horse Guards Parade
4 August 2012; 09:00	(12–21, 11–21); Report			Horse Guards Parade

4 August 2012; 13:00	Baquerizo – Fernández (ESP)	0–2	Cicolari – Menegatti (ITA)	Horse Guards Parade
4 August 2012; 13:00	(15–21, 15–21); Report			Horse Guards Parade

4 August 2012; 18:00	Maria – Talita (BRA)	1–2	Kolocová – Sluková (CZE)	Horse Guards Parade
4 August 2012; 18:00	(16–21, 22–20, 9–15); Report			Horse Guards Parade

4 August 2012; 21:00	May-Treanor – Walsh Jennings (USA)	2–0	Keizer – van Iersel (NED)	Horse Guards Parade
4 August 2012; 21:00	(21–13, 21–12); Report			Horse Guards Parade

=== Quarterfinals ===
5 August 2012; 18:00	Xue – Zhang (CHN)	2–0	Schwaiger – Schwaiger (AUT)	Horse Guards Parade
5 August 2012; 18:00	(21–18, 21–11); Report			Horse Guards Parade

5 August 2012; 19:00	May-Treanor – Walsh Jennings (USA)	2–0	Cicolari – Menegatti (ITA)	Horse Guards Parade
5 August 2012; 19:00	(21–13, 21–13); Report			Horse Guards Parade

5 August 2012; 22:00	Kolocová – Sluková (CZE)	0–2	Kessy – Ross (USA)	Horse Guards Parade
5 August 2012; 22:00	(23–25, 18–21); Report			Horse Guards Parade

5 August 2012; 23:00	Juliana – Larissa (BRA)	2–0	Goller – Ludwig (GER)	Horse Guards Parade
5 August 2012; 23:00	(21–10, 21–19); Report			Horse Guards Parade

=== Semifinals ===
7 August 2012; 18:00	May-Treanor – Walsh Jennings (USA)	2–0	Xue – Zhang (CHN)	Horse Guards Parade
7 August 2012; 18:00	(22–20, 22–20); Report			Horse Guards Parade

7 August 2012; 21:00	Juliana – Larissa (BRA)	1–2	Kessy – Ross (USA)	Horse Guards Parade
7 August 2012; 21:00	(21–15, 19–21, 12–15); Report			Horse Guards Parade

=== Bronze medal match ===
8 August 2012; 19:00	Xue – Zhang (CHN)	1–2	Juliana – Larissa (BRA)	Horse Guards Parade
8 August 2012; 19:00	(21–11, 19–21, 12–15); Report			Horse Guards Parade

=== Final ===
8 August 2012; 21:00	Kessy – Ross (USA)	0–2	May-Treanor – Walsh Jennings (USA)	Horse Guards Parade
8 August 2012; 21:00	(16–21, 16–21); Report			Horse Guards Parade

== Final ranking ==
Rank	Team	Seed
1st place, gold medalist(s)	Misty May-Treanor – Kerri Walsh Jennings (USA)	3
2nd place, silver medalist(s)	Jennifer Kessy – April Ross (USA)	4
3rd place, bronze medalist(s)	Juliana Felisberta – Larissa França (BRA)	1
4.	Xue Chen – Zhang Xi (beach volleyball) (CHN)	2
5.	Greta Cicolari – Marta Menegatti (ITA)	7
5.	Sara Goller – Laura Ludwig (GER)	8
5.	Kristýna Kolocová – Markéta Sluková (CZE)	10
5.	Doris Schwaiger – Stefanie Schwaiger (AUT)	15
9.	Maria Antonelli – Talita Antunes (BRA)	5
9.	Sanne Keizer – Marleen van Iersel (NED)	9
9.	Simone Kuhn – Nadine Zumkehr (SUI)	11
9.	Katrin Holtwick – Ilka Semmler (GER)	12
9.	Elsa Baquerizo – Liliana Fernández (ESP)	16
9.	Ekaterina Khomyakova – Evgenia Ukolova (RUS)	18
9.	Madelein Meppelink – Sophie van Gestel (NED)	20
9.	Anastasia Vasina – Anna Vozakova (RUS)	23
17.	Zara Dampney – Shauna Mullin (GBR)	6
17.	Lenka Háječková – Hana Klapalová (CZE)	13
19.	Vassiliki Arvaniti – Maria Tsiartsiani (GRE)	14
19.	Louise Bawden – Becchara Palmer (AUS)	17
19.	Marie-Andrée Lessard – Annie Martin (CAN)	19
19.	Ana Gallay – María Zonta (ARG)	21
19.	Natalie Cook – Tamsin Hinchley (AUS)	22
19.	Natacha Rigobert – Elodie Li Yuk Lo (MRI)	24

== See also ==
- Beach volleyball at the 2012 Summer Olympics – Men's tournament
