= Sophie van Gestel =

Dutch beach volleyball player (born 1991)

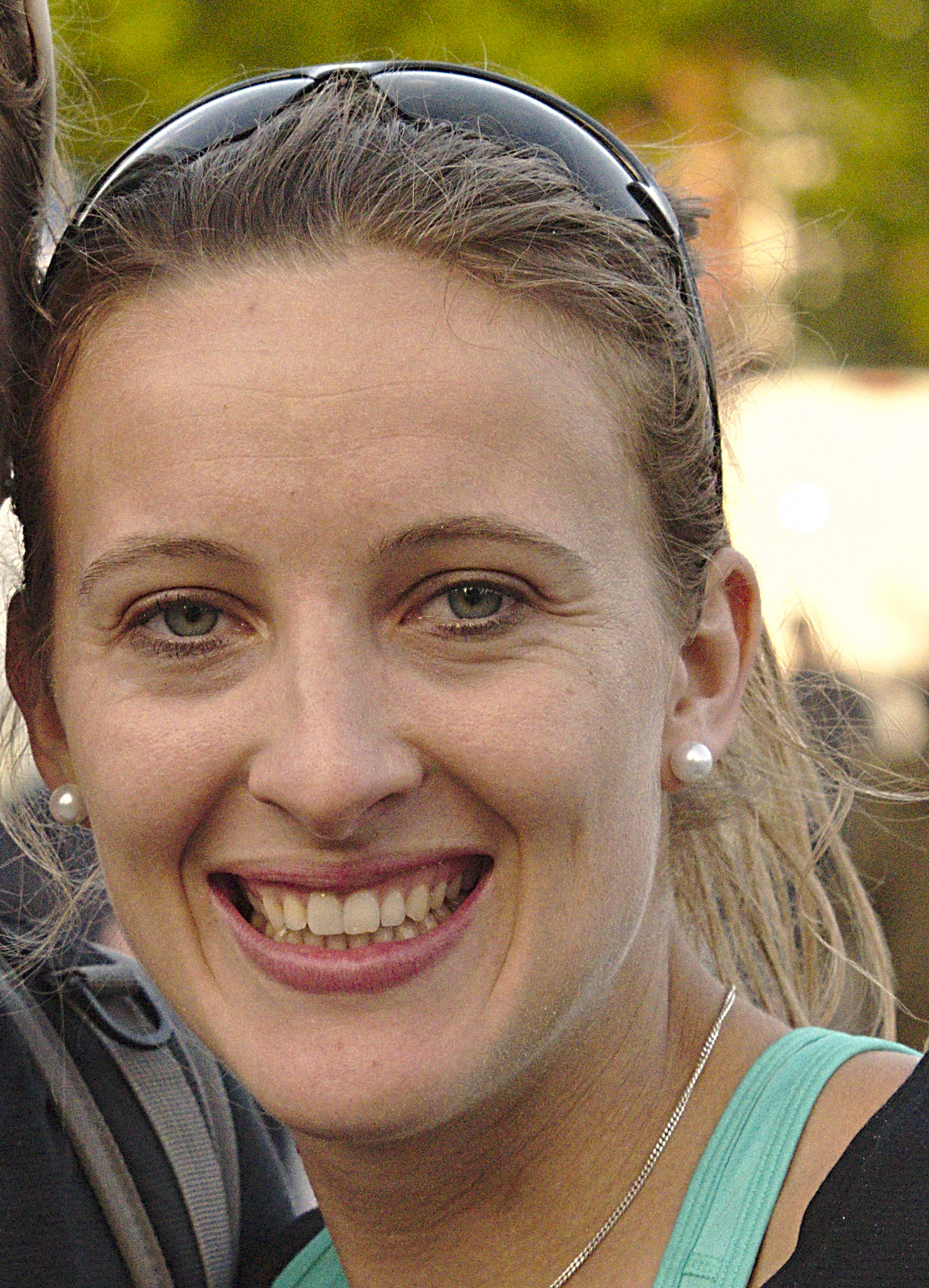
- Van Gestel in 2017

Personal information
- Nationality: Dutch
- Born: 29 June 1991 (age 35); Oostelbeers

Beach volleyball information

Current teammate
Years	Teammate
2015-	Jantine van der Vlist

National team
Netherlands

Sophie van Gestel (born 29 June 1991) is a Dutch beach volleyball player. As of 2012, she plays with Madelein Meppelink. The pair participated in the 2012 Summer Olympics tournament and lost in the round of 16 to Brazilians Juliana Felisberta and Larissa França who eventually won the bronze medal.

As of 2015, she plays with Jantine van der Vlist. They qualified for 2016 Summer Olympics in Rio de Janeiro. The pair played in Pool-E and were eliminated with a set win/loss of 1W/6L.

Awards
Preceded by Marta Menegatti (ITA)	Women's FIVB World Tour "Most Improved"; 2012	Succeeded by Kira Walkenhorst (GER)
