= Madelein Meppelink =

Dutch beach volleyball player (born 1989)

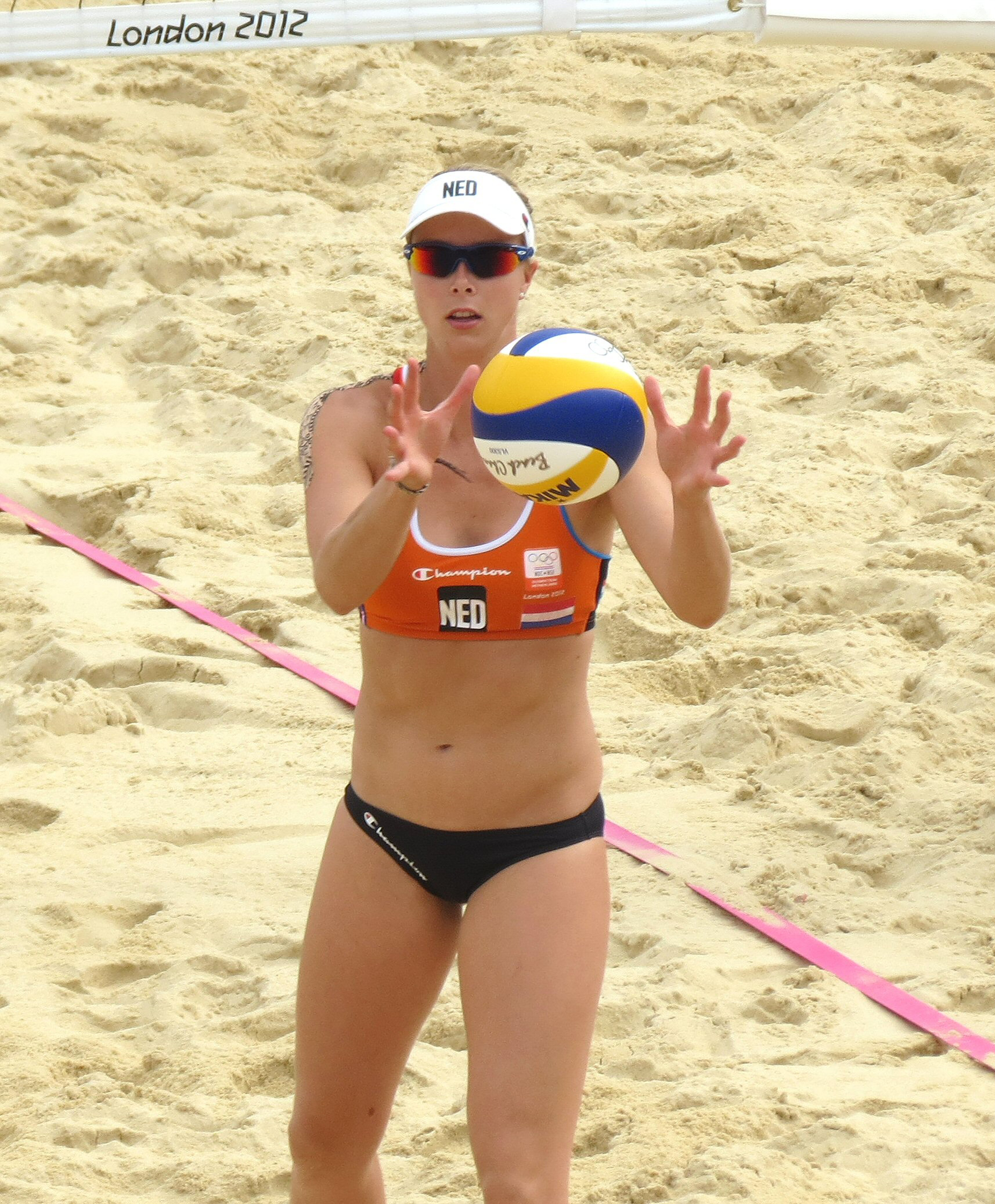
- Meppelink playing for the Netherlands during the 2012 Summer Olympics

Personal information
- Nationality: Dutch
- Born: 29 November 1989 (age 36); Rhenen
- Height: 1.83 m (6 ft 0 in)
- Weight: 75 kg (165 lb; 11 st 11 lb)

Beach volleyball information

Current teammate
Teammate
Marleen van Iersel
Honours
Women's beach volleyball
Representing Netherlands
European Championships
Gold medal – first place	2014 Cagliari	Beach volleyball

Madelein Meppelink (born 29 November 1989 in Rhenen) is a Dutch beach volleyball player.

== Professional career ==
From 2007 to 2009 she played with Margo Wiltens. From 2009 to 2011 she played with Marloes Wesselink. From 2011 to 2013 she played with Sophie van Gestel. The pair participated in the 2012 Summer Olympics tournament and lost in the round of 16 to Brazilians Juliana Felisberta and Larissa França, who eventually won the bronze medal. From 2013, she teamed up with Marleen van Iersel. They participated in the 2016 Summer Olympics in Rio. They made it to the Round of 16, and lost to the Swiss team of Heidrich and Zumkehr in 3 sets (21–19, 13–21, 10–15). From 2016 to 2017, she mostly teamed with van Gestel again, before switching to team with Sanne Keizer.
