= Anna Vozakova =

Russian beach volleyball player (born 1989)

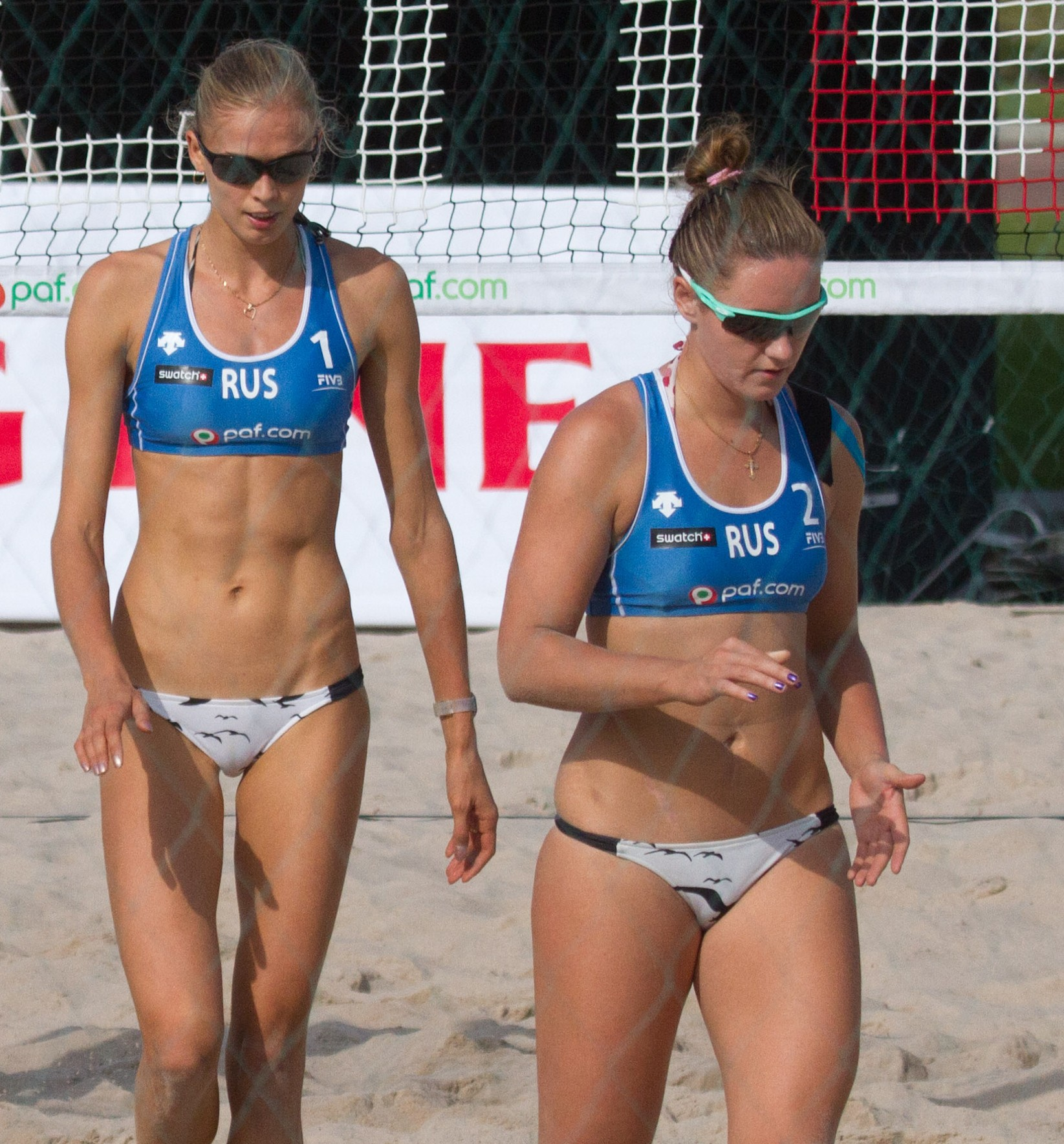
Anastasia Vasina (left) and Anna Vozakova (Right)

Anna Vozakova (born 27 February 1989, St Petersburg) is a Russian beach volleyball player. She competed alongside Anastasia Vasina at the 2012 Summer Olympics in London where they were defeated by the sisters Doris Schwaiger and Stefanie Schwaiger from Austria.
