= Hana Skalníková =

Czech beach volleyball player

Hana Klapalová
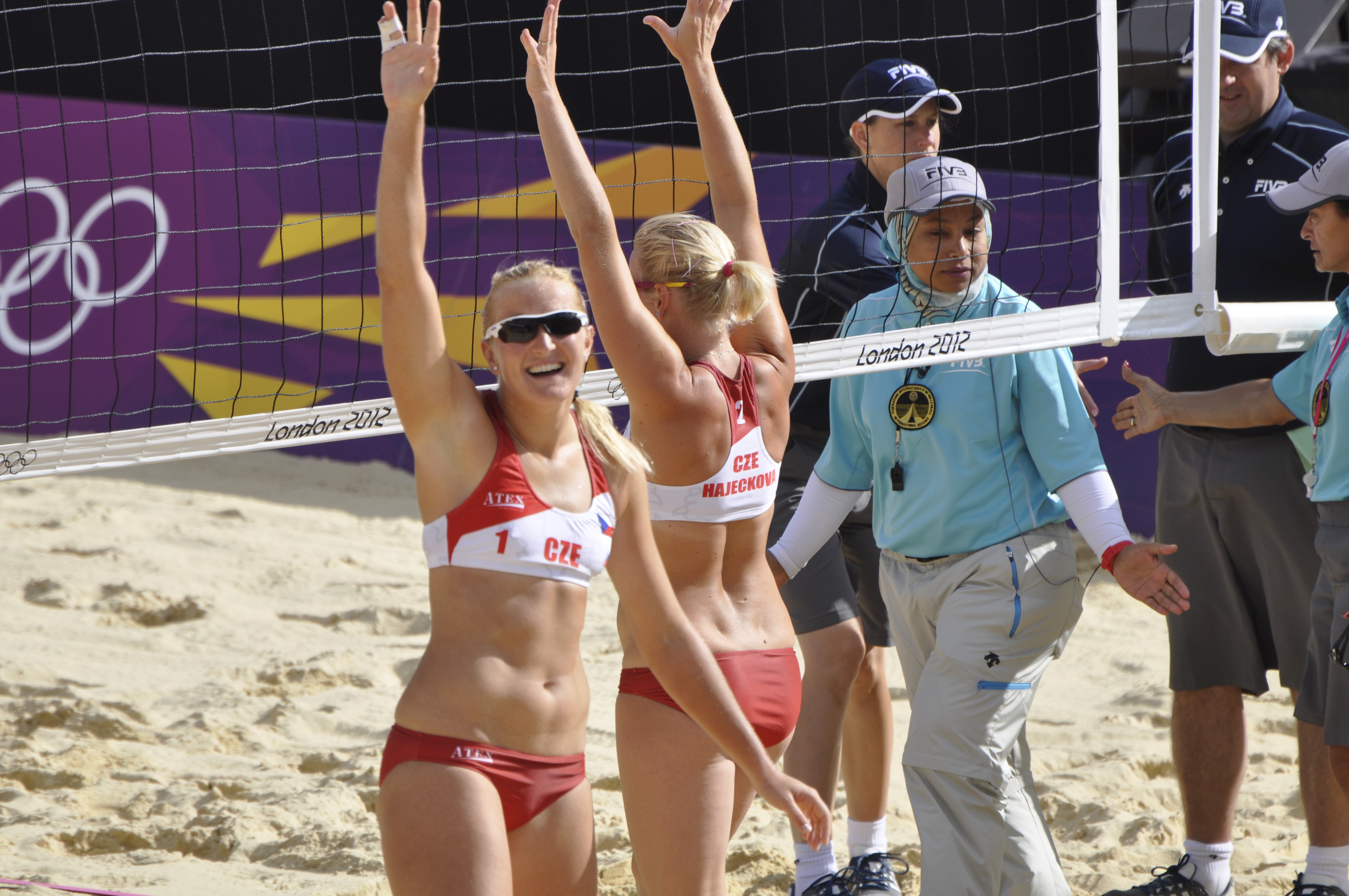
- Hana Klapalová and Lenka Háječková at the 2012 London Olympics

Personal information
- Nationality: Czech
- Born: 29 March 1982 (age 44) Brno, Czechoslovakia

Sport
- Country: Czech Republic
- Sport: Beach volleyball

Hana Skalníková (née Klapalová; Czech pronunciation: [ˈɦana ˈklapalovaː]; born 29 March 1982) is a Czech beach volleyball player. As of 2012, she plays with Lenka Háječková. They qualified for and participated at the 2012 Summer Olympics in London.
