= Lenka Háječková =

Czech beach volleyball player

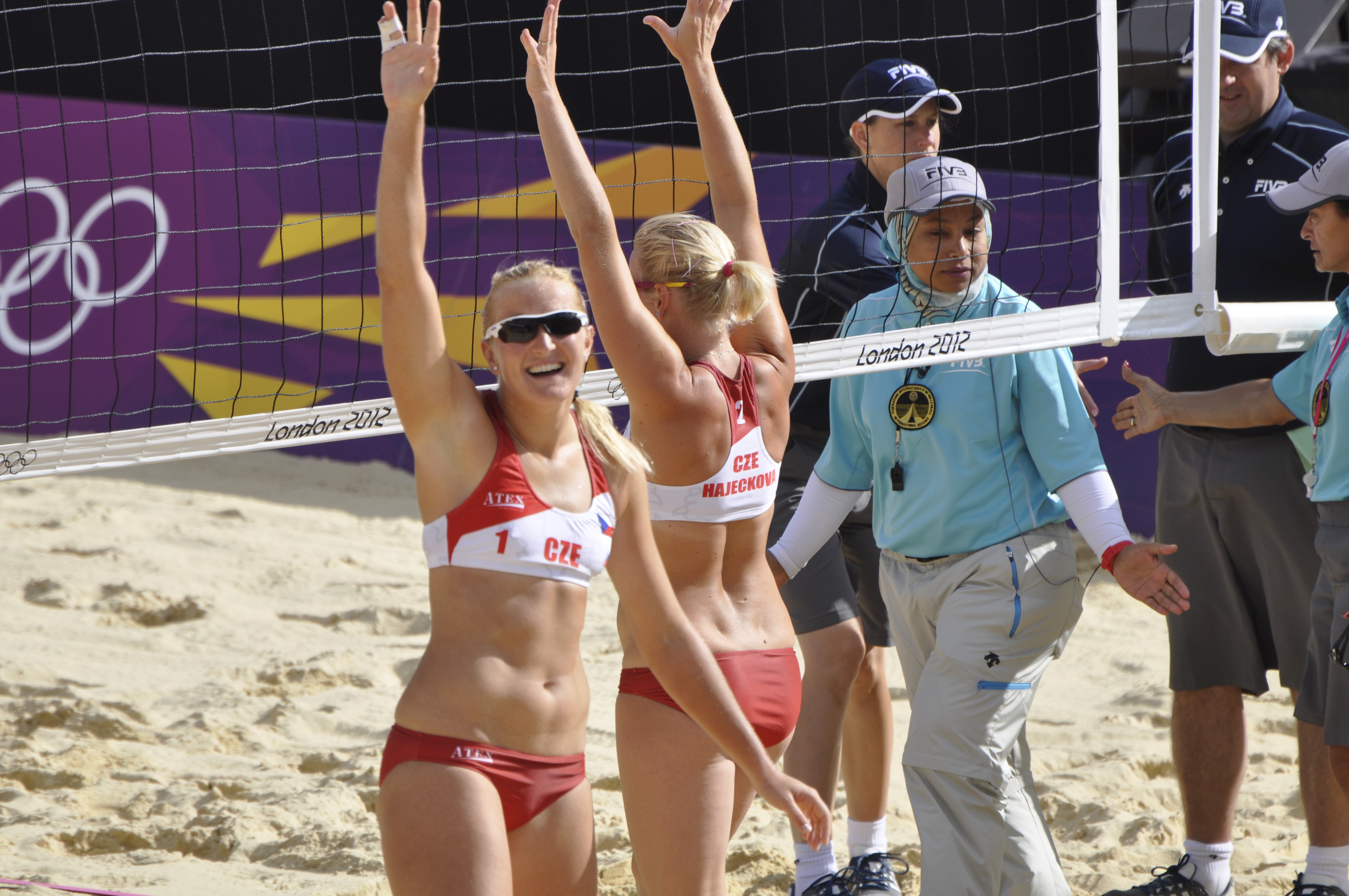
- Hana Klapalová and Lenka Háječková at the 2012 London Olympics

Personal information
- Birth name: Lenka Felbabová
- Nationality: Czech
- Born: 18 April 1978 (age 47); Prague, Czechoslovakia

Sport
- Country: Czech Republic
- Sport: Beach volleyball

Lenka Háječková (Czech pronunciation: [ˈlɛŋka ˈɦaːjɛtʃkovaː]) née Felbabová [ˈfɛlbabovaː] (born 18 April 1978) is a Czech beach volleyball player. As of 2012, she plays with Hana Klapalová. They competed at the 2012 Summer Olympics in London.

She was part of the Czech Republic women's national volleyball team at the 2002 FIVB Volleyball Women's World Championship in Germany.
