= Thomas Daniel (pentathlete) =

Austrian modern pentathlete

Personal information
- Nationality: Austria
- Born: 17 June 1985 (age 41) Schwarzach im Pongau, Austria
- Height: 1.79 m (5 ft 10 1/2 in)
- Weight: 70 kg (154 lb)

Sport
- Sport: Modern pentathlon
- Club: HSV Wiener Neustadt (AUT)
- Coached by: Horst Stocker

Thomas Daniel (born 17 June 1985 in Schwarzach im Pongau) is a modern pentathlete from Austria. He is the first Austrian modern pentathlete to qualify for the Olympics for 24 years, and competed in the men's event at the 2012 Summer Olympics in London, where he finished in sixth place, missing out on the chance of winning the nation's first medal of the Games.

Daniel also spent his sporting career as an army soldier, and had won an individual gold medal at the 2008 CISM Modern Pentathlon Championships in Riga, Latvia.
