= Anastasia Vasina =

Russian beach volleyball player (born 1987)

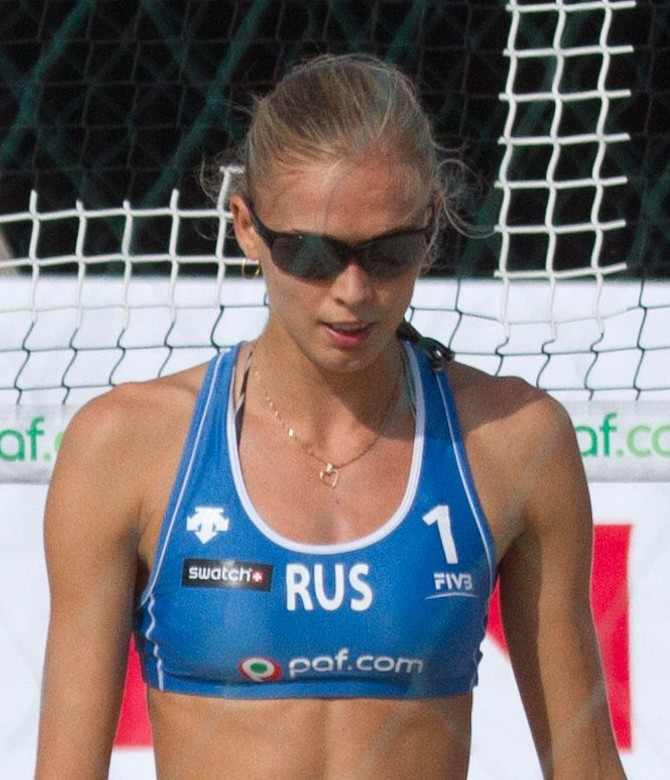
- Vasina at the Paf Open 2012

Personal information
- Native name: Анастасия Васина
- Birth name: Anastasia Gennadyevna Vasina
- Nationality: Russian
- Born: 18 December 1987 (age 37); Serpukhov, Russian Federation
- Height: 6 ft 2 in (188 cm)

Sport
- Country: Russia
- Sport: Beach volleyball

Anastasia Gennadyevna Vasina (Russian: Анастасия Геннадьевна Васина; born 18 December 1987) is a Russian beach volleyball player. As of 2012, she plays with Anna Vozakova. They competed at the 2012 Summer Olympics in London. They are the first representatives of Russia in beach volleyball competing in the Olympics. In the first round of the games, the Russians pulled an upset against the match favorites Xue Chen and Zhang Xi from China and qualified to the next round as first in their group but were eliminated by the Austrian team in the round of 16. Vasina currently plays with Alexandra Moiseeva.
