= Stefanie Schwaiger =

Austrian beach volleyball player (born 1986)

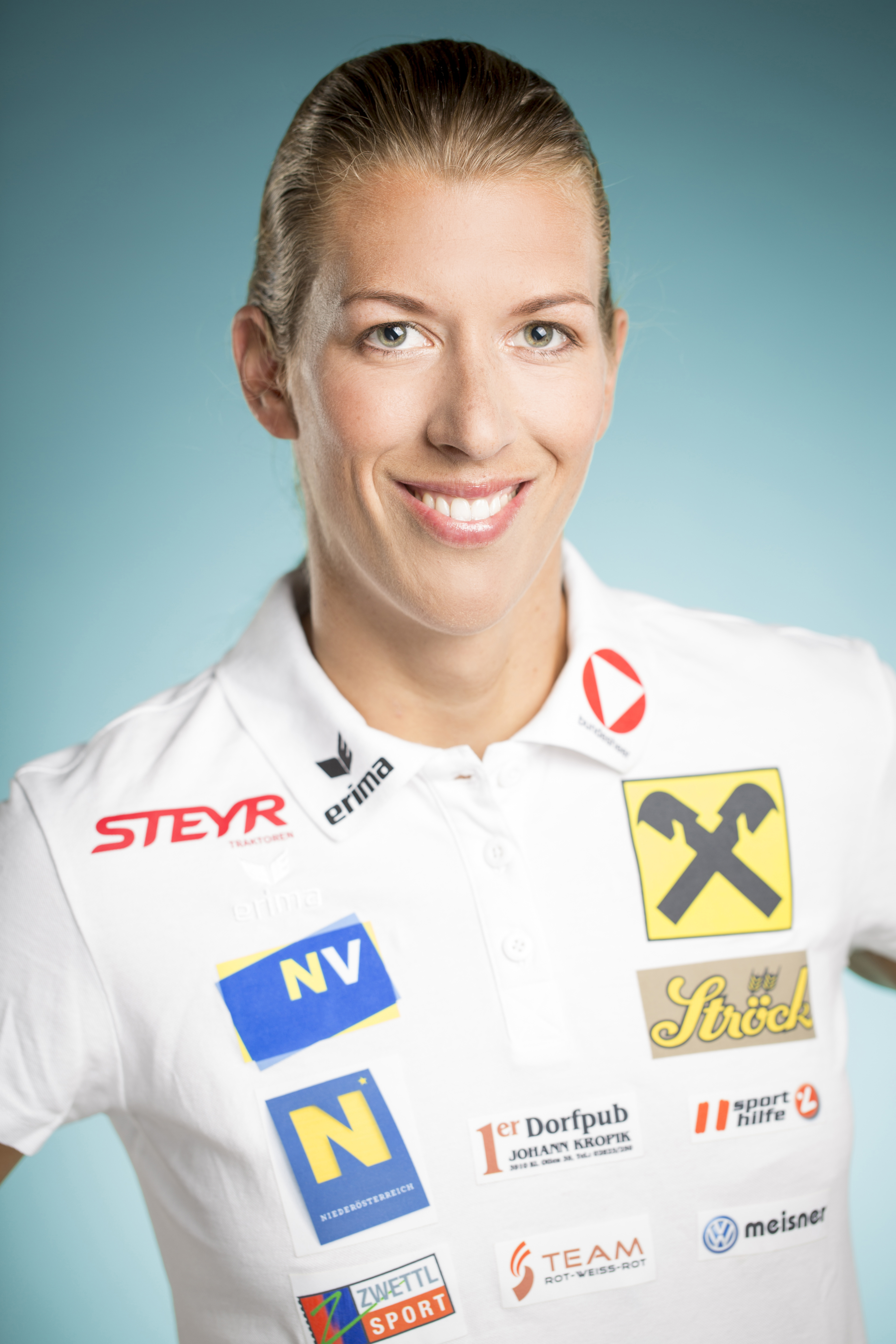
- Schwaiger in 2014

Personal information
- Born: 7 August 1986 (age 40); Allentsteig, Austria
- Height: 182 cm (6 ft 0 in)

Beach volleyball information

Current teammate
Teammate
Doris Schwaiger
Honours
Women's beach volleyball
Representing Austria
European Championships
Gold medal – first place	2013 Klagenfurt	Beach

Stefanie Schwaiger (born 7 August 1986) is an Austrian beach volleyball player.

She is the sister of Doris Schwaiger, and they are the team Schwaiger – Schwaiger in international beach volleyball. The sisters, born a year apart, represented Austria at the 2008 Summer Olympics in Beijing, China and the 2012 Summer Olympics in London, Great Britain. They finished 5th in both tournaments. At the 2008 Summer Olympics, they lost 2 – 0 to Tian Jia and Wang Jie of China in the quarterfinals while at the 2012 Summer Olympics they lost in the quarterfinals 2–0 to Zhang Xi and Xue Chen, also of China.
