= Doris Schwaiger =

Austrian beach volleyball player (born 1985)

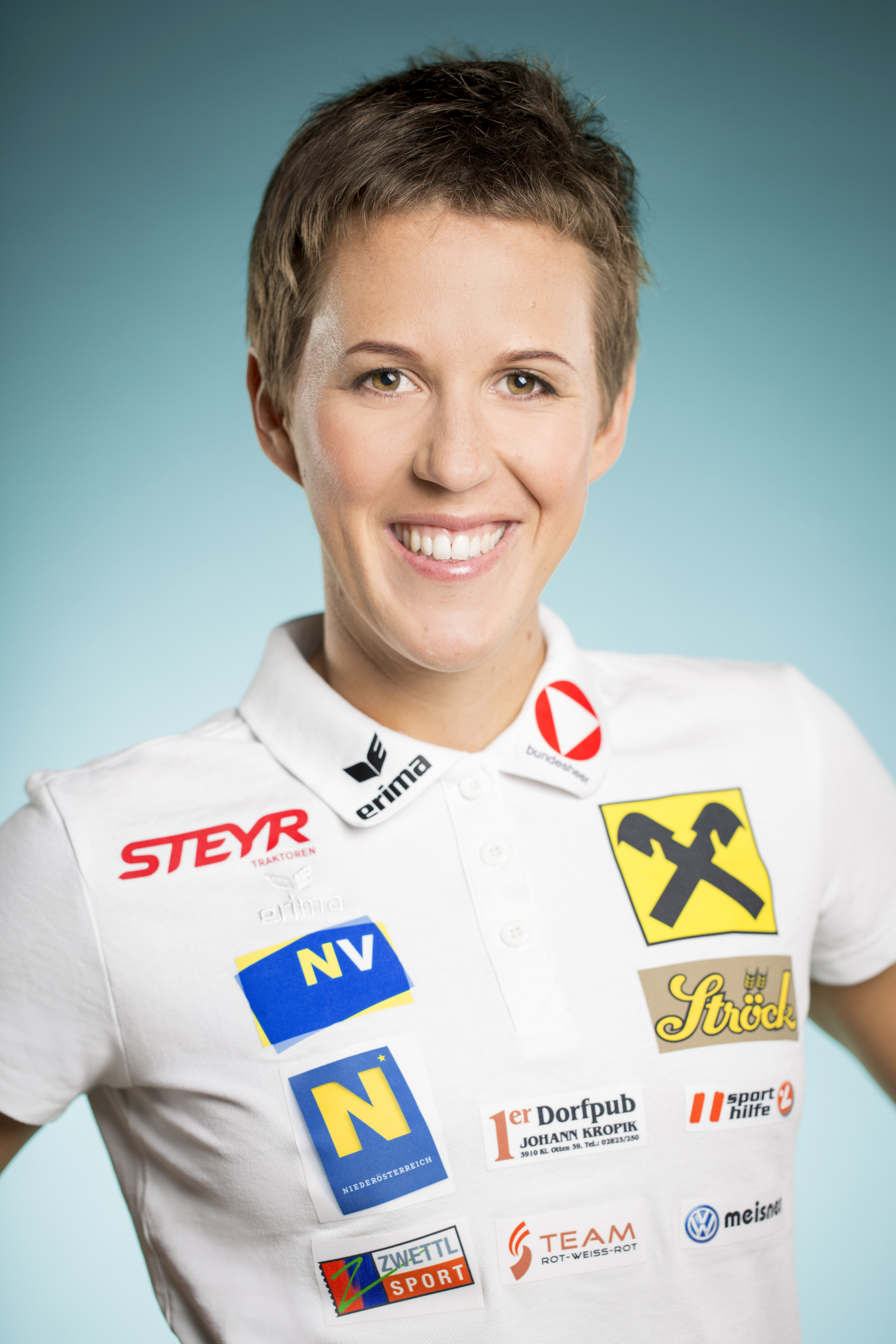
- Schwaiger in 2014

Personal information
- Born: 28 February 1985 (age 41); Allentsteig, Austria
- Height: 172 cm (5 ft 8 in)

Beach volleyball information
Years	Teammate
2002–2014	Stefanie Schwaiger
Honours
Women's beach volleyball
Representing Austria
European Championships
Gold medal – first place	2013 Klagenfurt	Beach

Doris Schwaiger (born 28 February 1985) is a retired female beach volleyball player from Austria.

She is the sister of Stefanie Schwaiger, and they play together in international beach volleyball. The sisters first appeared together at the 2002 FIVB U19 Beach Volleyball World Championships in Xylokastro and then made their World Tour debuts the following year at the Klagenfurt Grand Slam. Their best ever finish on the FIVB Beach Volleyball World Tour was second at the 2013 Shanghai Grand Slam.

The sisters represented Austria at the 2008 Summer Olympics in Beijing, China and the 2012 Summer Olympics in London. They reached the quarterfinals both times.

On 30 May 2014 Doris Schwaiger announced her retirement from beach volleyball.
